

252001–252100 

|-bgcolor=#fefefe
| 252001 ||  || — || March 5, 2000 || Socorro || LINEAR || — || align=right | 1.2 km || 
|-id=002 bgcolor=#d6d6d6
| 252002 ||  || — || March 5, 2000 || Socorro || LINEAR || 2:1J || align=right | 7.9 km || 
|-id=003 bgcolor=#E9E9E9
| 252003 ||  || — || March 3, 2000 || Socorro || LINEAR || — || align=right | 1.1 km || 
|-id=004 bgcolor=#fefefe
| 252004 ||  || — || March 26, 2000 || Socorro || LINEAR || PHO || align=right | 2.4 km || 
|-id=005 bgcolor=#E9E9E9
| 252005 ||  || — || March 30, 2000 || Kitt Peak || Spacewatch || — || align=right | 1.6 km || 
|-id=006 bgcolor=#E9E9E9
| 252006 ||  || — || March 30, 2000 || Kitt Peak || Spacewatch || RAF || align=right | 1.2 km || 
|-id=007 bgcolor=#E9E9E9
| 252007 ||  || — || March 30, 2000 || Kitt Peak || Spacewatch || — || align=right | 1.3 km || 
|-id=008 bgcolor=#E9E9E9
| 252008 ||  || — || April 5, 2000 || Socorro || LINEAR || EUN || align=right | 1.9 km || 
|-id=009 bgcolor=#E9E9E9
| 252009 ||  || — || April 5, 2000 || Socorro || LINEAR || EUN || align=right | 1.5 km || 
|-id=010 bgcolor=#E9E9E9
| 252010 ||  || — || April 5, 2000 || Socorro || LINEAR || RAF || align=right | 1.6 km || 
|-id=011 bgcolor=#E9E9E9
| 252011 ||  || — || April 5, 2000 || Socorro || LINEAR || JUN || align=right | 1.6 km || 
|-id=012 bgcolor=#E9E9E9
| 252012 ||  || — || April 5, 2000 || Socorro || LINEAR || — || align=right | 2.2 km || 
|-id=013 bgcolor=#E9E9E9
| 252013 ||  || — || April 7, 2000 || Socorro || LINEAR || — || align=right | 2.3 km || 
|-id=014 bgcolor=#E9E9E9
| 252014 ||  || — || April 7, 2000 || Socorro || LINEAR || — || align=right | 2.3 km || 
|-id=015 bgcolor=#E9E9E9
| 252015 ||  || — || April 24, 2000 || Kitt Peak || Spacewatch || — || align=right | 1.8 km || 
|-id=016 bgcolor=#E9E9E9
| 252016 ||  || — || April 25, 2000 || Anderson Mesa || LONEOS || — || align=right | 1.2 km || 
|-id=017 bgcolor=#E9E9E9
| 252017 ||  || — || April 27, 2000 || Anderson Mesa || LONEOS || RAF || align=right | 1.3 km || 
|-id=018 bgcolor=#E9E9E9
| 252018 ||  || — || April 27, 2000 || Anderson Mesa || LONEOS || — || align=right | 1.8 km || 
|-id=019 bgcolor=#E9E9E9
| 252019 ||  || — || April 25, 2000 || Anderson Mesa || LONEOS || — || align=right | 2.6 km || 
|-id=020 bgcolor=#E9E9E9
| 252020 ||  || — || April 29, 2000 || Socorro || LINEAR || — || align=right | 1.7 km || 
|-id=021 bgcolor=#E9E9E9
| 252021 ||  || — || April 30, 2000 || Haleakala || NEAT || — || align=right | 1.8 km || 
|-id=022 bgcolor=#E9E9E9
| 252022 ||  || — || May 3, 2000 || Socorro || LINEAR || — || align=right | 1.6 km || 
|-id=023 bgcolor=#E9E9E9
| 252023 ||  || — || May 4, 2000 || Apache Point || SDSS || — || align=right | 2.4 km || 
|-id=024 bgcolor=#E9E9E9
| 252024 || 2000 KS || — || May 25, 2000 || Prescott || P. G. Comba || — || align=right | 3.9 km || 
|-id=025 bgcolor=#E9E9E9
| 252025 ||  || — || May 28, 2000 || Socorro || LINEAR || — || align=right | 3.1 km || 
|-id=026 bgcolor=#E9E9E9
| 252026 ||  || — || May 28, 2000 || Socorro || LINEAR || — || align=right | 3.3 km || 
|-id=027 bgcolor=#E9E9E9
| 252027 ||  || — || May 24, 2000 || Kitt Peak || Spacewatch || ADE || align=right | 3.7 km || 
|-id=028 bgcolor=#E9E9E9
| 252028 ||  || — || May 24, 2000 || Kitt Peak || Spacewatch || — || align=right | 2.3 km || 
|-id=029 bgcolor=#E9E9E9
| 252029 ||  || — || July 4, 2000 || Kitt Peak || Spacewatch || DOR || align=right | 3.1 km || 
|-id=030 bgcolor=#fefefe
| 252030 ||  || — || July 29, 2000 || Anderson Mesa || LONEOS || — || align=right | 1.1 km || 
|-id=031 bgcolor=#E9E9E9
| 252031 ||  || — || July 29, 2000 || Anderson Mesa || LONEOS || GEF || align=right | 1.9 km || 
|-id=032 bgcolor=#E9E9E9
| 252032 ||  || — || July 31, 2000 || Cerro Tololo || M. W. Buie || — || align=right | 2.4 km || 
|-id=033 bgcolor=#fefefe
| 252033 ||  || — || August 24, 2000 || Socorro || LINEAR || — || align=right data-sort-value="0.94" | 940 m || 
|-id=034 bgcolor=#E9E9E9
| 252034 ||  || — || August 24, 2000 || Socorro || LINEAR || — || align=right | 2.9 km || 
|-id=035 bgcolor=#d6d6d6
| 252035 ||  || — || August 25, 2000 || Socorro || LINEAR || YAK || align=right | 3.8 km || 
|-id=036 bgcolor=#fefefe
| 252036 ||  || — || August 24, 2000 || Socorro || LINEAR || — || align=right data-sort-value="0.79" | 790 m || 
|-id=037 bgcolor=#d6d6d6
| 252037 ||  || — || August 30, 2000 || Bergisch Gladbach || W. Bickel || — || align=right | 3.0 km || 
|-id=038 bgcolor=#FA8072
| 252038 ||  || — || August 31, 2000 || Socorro || LINEAR || H || align=right data-sort-value="0.68" | 680 m || 
|-id=039 bgcolor=#fefefe
| 252039 ||  || — || August 25, 2000 || Socorro || LINEAR || — || align=right data-sort-value="0.89" | 890 m || 
|-id=040 bgcolor=#fefefe
| 252040 ||  || — || August 31, 2000 || Socorro || LINEAR || — || align=right | 1.3 km || 
|-id=041 bgcolor=#E9E9E9
| 252041 ||  || — || August 31, 2000 || Socorro || LINEAR || — || align=right | 2.5 km || 
|-id=042 bgcolor=#fefefe
| 252042 ||  || — || August 31, 2000 || Socorro || LINEAR || — || align=right | 1.2 km || 
|-id=043 bgcolor=#fefefe
| 252043 ||  || — || August 21, 2000 || Anderson Mesa || LONEOS || FLO || align=right data-sort-value="0.80" | 800 m || 
|-id=044 bgcolor=#E9E9E9
| 252044 ||  || — || August 25, 2000 || Cerro Tololo || M. W. Buie || — || align=right | 2.5 km || 
|-id=045 bgcolor=#E9E9E9
| 252045 ||  || — || September 1, 2000 || Socorro || LINEAR || — || align=right | 5.0 km || 
|-id=046 bgcolor=#fefefe
| 252046 ||  || — || September 1, 2000 || Socorro || LINEAR || — || align=right | 1.2 km || 
|-id=047 bgcolor=#E9E9E9
| 252047 ||  || — || September 3, 2000 || Socorro || LINEAR || MRX || align=right | 1.2 km || 
|-id=048 bgcolor=#fefefe
| 252048 ||  || — || September 3, 2000 || Socorro || LINEAR || FLO || align=right data-sort-value="0.75" | 750 m || 
|-id=049 bgcolor=#fefefe
| 252049 ||  || — || September 24, 2000 || Prescott || P. G. Comba || — || align=right data-sort-value="0.87" | 870 m || 
|-id=050 bgcolor=#FA8072
| 252050 ||  || — || September 22, 2000 || Socorro || LINEAR || — || align=right data-sort-value="0.86" | 860 m || 
|-id=051 bgcolor=#fefefe
| 252051 ||  || — || September 21, 2000 || Socorro || LINEAR || FLO || align=right data-sort-value="0.71" | 710 m || 
|-id=052 bgcolor=#d6d6d6
| 252052 ||  || — || September 23, 2000 || Socorro || LINEAR || CHA || align=right | 3.2 km || 
|-id=053 bgcolor=#fefefe
| 252053 ||  || — || September 23, 2000 || Socorro || LINEAR || FLO || align=right data-sort-value="0.94" | 940 m || 
|-id=054 bgcolor=#fefefe
| 252054 ||  || — || September 23, 2000 || Socorro || LINEAR || — || align=right | 1.2 km || 
|-id=055 bgcolor=#d6d6d6
| 252055 ||  || — || September 24, 2000 || Socorro || LINEAR || — || align=right | 3.5 km || 
|-id=056 bgcolor=#d6d6d6
| 252056 ||  || — || September 24, 2000 || Socorro || LINEAR || — || align=right | 3.2 km || 
|-id=057 bgcolor=#fefefe
| 252057 ||  || — || September 24, 2000 || Socorro || LINEAR || FLO || align=right data-sort-value="0.86" | 860 m || 
|-id=058 bgcolor=#fefefe
| 252058 ||  || — || September 23, 2000 || Socorro || LINEAR || FLO || align=right data-sort-value="0.96" | 960 m || 
|-id=059 bgcolor=#d6d6d6
| 252059 ||  || — || September 24, 2000 || Socorro || LINEAR || — || align=right | 2.2 km || 
|-id=060 bgcolor=#E9E9E9
| 252060 ||  || — || September 24, 2000 || Socorro || LINEAR || — || align=right | 2.8 km || 
|-id=061 bgcolor=#fefefe
| 252061 ||  || — || September 24, 2000 || Socorro || LINEAR || — || align=right | 1.0 km || 
|-id=062 bgcolor=#fefefe
| 252062 ||  || — || September 23, 2000 || Socorro || LINEAR || — || align=right | 1.1 km || 
|-id=063 bgcolor=#fefefe
| 252063 ||  || — || September 23, 2000 || Socorro || LINEAR || FLO || align=right data-sort-value="0.89" | 890 m || 
|-id=064 bgcolor=#fefefe
| 252064 ||  || — || September 24, 2000 || Socorro || LINEAR || — || align=right data-sort-value="0.99" | 990 m || 
|-id=065 bgcolor=#E9E9E9
| 252065 ||  || — || September 25, 2000 || Socorro || LINEAR || — || align=right | 3.4 km || 
|-id=066 bgcolor=#fefefe
| 252066 ||  || — || September 23, 2000 || Socorro || LINEAR || — || align=right | 1.3 km || 
|-id=067 bgcolor=#fefefe
| 252067 ||  || — || September 23, 2000 || Socorro || LINEAR || FLO || align=right data-sort-value="0.98" | 980 m || 
|-id=068 bgcolor=#FA8072
| 252068 ||  || — || September 24, 2000 || Socorro || LINEAR || — || align=right | 1.1 km || 
|-id=069 bgcolor=#fefefe
| 252069 ||  || — || September 27, 2000 || Socorro || LINEAR || PHO || align=right | 2.6 km || 
|-id=070 bgcolor=#fefefe
| 252070 ||  || — || September 24, 2000 || Socorro || LINEAR || FLO || align=right data-sort-value="0.76" | 760 m || 
|-id=071 bgcolor=#fefefe
| 252071 ||  || — || September 25, 2000 || Socorro || LINEAR || FLO || align=right data-sort-value="0.99" | 990 m || 
|-id=072 bgcolor=#fefefe
| 252072 ||  || — || September 24, 2000 || Socorro || LINEAR || — || align=right data-sort-value="0.98" | 980 m || 
|-id=073 bgcolor=#FA8072
| 252073 ||  || — || September 24, 2000 || Socorro || LINEAR || — || align=right | 1.1 km || 
|-id=074 bgcolor=#fefefe
| 252074 ||  || — || September 26, 2000 || Socorro || LINEAR || FLO || align=right | 1.1 km || 
|-id=075 bgcolor=#fefefe
| 252075 ||  || — || September 24, 2000 || Socorro || LINEAR || FLO || align=right data-sort-value="0.80" | 800 m || 
|-id=076 bgcolor=#fefefe
| 252076 ||  || — || September 23, 2000 || Socorro || LINEAR || V || align=right data-sort-value="0.85" | 850 m || 
|-id=077 bgcolor=#d6d6d6
| 252077 ||  || — || September 24, 2000 || Socorro || LINEAR || KOR || align=right | 1.7 km || 
|-id=078 bgcolor=#fefefe
| 252078 ||  || — || September 27, 2000 || Socorro || LINEAR || FLO || align=right data-sort-value="0.80" | 800 m || 
|-id=079 bgcolor=#fefefe
| 252079 ||  || — || September 30, 2000 || Socorro || LINEAR || FLOslow || align=right | 1.0 km || 
|-id=080 bgcolor=#E9E9E9
| 252080 ||  || — || September 25, 2000 || Kitt Peak || Spacewatch || — || align=right | 2.8 km || 
|-id=081 bgcolor=#fefefe
| 252081 ||  || — || September 24, 2000 || Socorro || LINEAR || — || align=right data-sort-value="0.86" | 860 m || 
|-id=082 bgcolor=#E9E9E9
| 252082 ||  || — || September 24, 2000 || Anderson Mesa || LONEOS || DOR || align=right | 4.2 km || 
|-id=083 bgcolor=#fefefe
| 252083 ||  || — || October 1, 2000 || Socorro || LINEAR || — || align=right data-sort-value="0.63" | 630 m || 
|-id=084 bgcolor=#fefefe
| 252084 ||  || — || October 1, 2000 || Socorro || LINEAR || — || align=right | 1.1 km || 
|-id=085 bgcolor=#E9E9E9
| 252085 ||  || — || October 1, 2000 || Socorro || LINEAR || — || align=right | 4.4 km || 
|-id=086 bgcolor=#d6d6d6
| 252086 ||  || — || October 1, 2000 || Socorro || LINEAR || KOR || align=right | 1.7 km || 
|-id=087 bgcolor=#FA8072
| 252087 ||  || — || October 24, 2000 || Socorro || LINEAR || — || align=right | 1.4 km || 
|-id=088 bgcolor=#fefefe
| 252088 ||  || — || October 25, 2000 || Socorro || LINEAR || FLO || align=right data-sort-value="0.95" | 950 m || 
|-id=089 bgcolor=#FA8072
| 252089 ||  || — || October 24, 2000 || Socorro || LINEAR || PHO || align=right | 1.6 km || 
|-id=090 bgcolor=#fefefe
| 252090 ||  || — || October 25, 2000 || Socorro || LINEAR || — || align=right | 1.2 km || 
|-id=091 bgcolor=#FFC2E0
| 252091 ||  || — || October 30, 2000 || Socorro || LINEAR || APO +1km || align=right | 1.3 km || 
|-id=092 bgcolor=#fefefe
| 252092 ||  || — || October 24, 2000 || Socorro || LINEAR || — || align=right | 1.5 km || 
|-id=093 bgcolor=#fefefe
| 252093 ||  || — || October 24, 2000 || Socorro || LINEAR || — || align=right data-sort-value="0.94" | 940 m || 
|-id=094 bgcolor=#fefefe
| 252094 ||  || — || October 24, 2000 || Socorro || LINEAR || FLO || align=right data-sort-value="0.88" | 880 m || 
|-id=095 bgcolor=#fefefe
| 252095 ||  || — || October 25, 2000 || Socorro || LINEAR || — || align=right | 1.3 km || 
|-id=096 bgcolor=#fefefe
| 252096 ||  || — || October 25, 2000 || Socorro || LINEAR || FLO || align=right data-sort-value="0.73" | 730 m || 
|-id=097 bgcolor=#fefefe
| 252097 ||  || — || October 25, 2000 || Socorro || LINEAR || FLO || align=right | 1.0 km || 
|-id=098 bgcolor=#d6d6d6
| 252098 ||  || — || October 25, 2000 || Socorro || LINEAR || CHA || align=right | 3.0 km || 
|-id=099 bgcolor=#fefefe
| 252099 ||  || — || October 25, 2000 || Socorro || LINEAR || — || align=right data-sort-value="0.98" | 980 m || 
|-id=100 bgcolor=#d6d6d6
| 252100 ||  || — || October 25, 2000 || Socorro || LINEAR || EOS || align=right | 2.7 km || 
|}

252101–252200 

|-bgcolor=#d6d6d6
| 252101 ||  || — || November 1, 2000 || Socorro || LINEAR || — || align=right | 3.2 km || 
|-id=102 bgcolor=#fefefe
| 252102 ||  || — || November 1, 2000 || Socorro || LINEAR || — || align=right data-sort-value="0.92" | 920 m || 
|-id=103 bgcolor=#d6d6d6
| 252103 ||  || — || November 1, 2000 || Socorro || LINEAR || LAU || align=right | 2.2 km || 
|-id=104 bgcolor=#fefefe
| 252104 ||  || — || November 3, 2000 || Socorro || LINEAR || — || align=right | 1.1 km || 
|-id=105 bgcolor=#d6d6d6
| 252105 ||  || — || November 3, 2000 || Socorro || LINEAR || — || align=right | 4.6 km || 
|-id=106 bgcolor=#fefefe
| 252106 ||  || — || November 20, 2000 || Socorro || LINEAR || — || align=right | 1.1 km || 
|-id=107 bgcolor=#d6d6d6
| 252107 ||  || — || November 24, 2000 || Bisei SG Center || BATTeRS || — || align=right | 4.0 km || 
|-id=108 bgcolor=#d6d6d6
| 252108 ||  || — || November 21, 2000 || Socorro || LINEAR || — || align=right | 4.3 km || 
|-id=109 bgcolor=#fefefe
| 252109 ||  || — || November 21, 2000 || Socorro || LINEAR || — || align=right | 1.5 km || 
|-id=110 bgcolor=#d6d6d6
| 252110 ||  || — || November 25, 2000 || Kitt Peak || Spacewatch || — || align=right | 3.0 km || 
|-id=111 bgcolor=#d6d6d6
| 252111 ||  || — || November 20, 2000 || Socorro || LINEAR || — || align=right | 3.9 km || 
|-id=112 bgcolor=#fefefe
| 252112 ||  || — || November 25, 2000 || Socorro || LINEAR || FLO || align=right data-sort-value="0.96" | 960 m || 
|-id=113 bgcolor=#d6d6d6
| 252113 ||  || — || November 20, 2000 || Socorro || LINEAR || — || align=right | 2.9 km || 
|-id=114 bgcolor=#fefefe
| 252114 ||  || — || November 20, 2000 || Socorro || LINEAR || FLO || align=right data-sort-value="0.91" | 910 m || 
|-id=115 bgcolor=#fefefe
| 252115 ||  || — || November 21, 2000 || Socorro || LINEAR || — || align=right | 1.0 km || 
|-id=116 bgcolor=#fefefe
| 252116 ||  || — || November 21, 2000 || Socorro || LINEAR || — || align=right | 1.2 km || 
|-id=117 bgcolor=#fefefe
| 252117 ||  || — || November 20, 2000 || Socorro || LINEAR || PHO || align=right | 1.7 km || 
|-id=118 bgcolor=#d6d6d6
| 252118 ||  || — || November 28, 2000 || Kitt Peak || Spacewatch || — || align=right | 2.6 km || 
|-id=119 bgcolor=#d6d6d6
| 252119 ||  || — || November 20, 2000 || Socorro || LINEAR || — || align=right | 3.9 km || 
|-id=120 bgcolor=#fefefe
| 252120 ||  || — || November 20, 2000 || Socorro || LINEAR || — || align=right data-sort-value="0.97" | 970 m || 
|-id=121 bgcolor=#d6d6d6
| 252121 ||  || — || November 21, 2000 || Socorro || LINEAR || — || align=right | 3.4 km || 
|-id=122 bgcolor=#fefefe
| 252122 ||  || — || November 28, 2000 || Socorro || LINEAR || PHO || align=right | 1.9 km || 
|-id=123 bgcolor=#d6d6d6
| 252123 ||  || — || November 20, 2000 || Socorro || LINEAR || EOS || align=right | 3.0 km || 
|-id=124 bgcolor=#d6d6d6
| 252124 ||  || — || November 17, 2000 || Kitt Peak || Spacewatch || IMH || align=right | 3.5 km || 
|-id=125 bgcolor=#fefefe
| 252125 ||  || — || November 27, 2000 || Kitt Peak || Spacewatch || FLO || align=right data-sort-value="0.94" | 940 m || 
|-id=126 bgcolor=#d6d6d6
| 252126 ||  || — || November 30, 2000 || Socorro || LINEAR || — || align=right | 2.9 km || 
|-id=127 bgcolor=#fefefe
| 252127 ||  || — || November 25, 2000 || Socorro || LINEAR || PHO || align=right | 2.3 km || 
|-id=128 bgcolor=#fefefe
| 252128 ||  || — || December 4, 2000 || Bohyunsan || Y.-B. Jeon, B.-C. Lee || V || align=right data-sort-value="0.85" | 850 m || 
|-id=129 bgcolor=#d6d6d6
| 252129 ||  || — || December 4, 2000 || Socorro || LINEAR || — || align=right | 5.2 km || 
|-id=130 bgcolor=#d6d6d6
| 252130 ||  || — || December 6, 2000 || Socorro || LINEAR || — || align=right | 3.6 km || 
|-id=131 bgcolor=#d6d6d6
| 252131 ||  || — || December 4, 2000 || Uccle || T. Pauwels || URS || align=right | 5.3 km || 
|-id=132 bgcolor=#d6d6d6
| 252132 ||  || — || December 20, 2000 || Kitt Peak || Spacewatch || — || align=right | 4.2 km || 
|-id=133 bgcolor=#fefefe
| 252133 ||  || — || December 21, 2000 || Kitt Peak || Spacewatch || H || align=right | 1.1 km || 
|-id=134 bgcolor=#d6d6d6
| 252134 ||  || — || December 22, 2000 || Kitt Peak || Spacewatch || — || align=right | 3.6 km || 
|-id=135 bgcolor=#d6d6d6
| 252135 ||  || — || December 21, 2000 || Kitt Peak || Spacewatch || — || align=right | 2.5 km || 
|-id=136 bgcolor=#fefefe
| 252136 ||  || — || December 28, 2000 || Kitt Peak || Spacewatch || — || align=right data-sort-value="0.87" | 870 m || 
|-id=137 bgcolor=#d6d6d6
| 252137 ||  || — || December 30, 2000 || Socorro || LINEAR || — || align=right | 5.3 km || 
|-id=138 bgcolor=#d6d6d6
| 252138 ||  || — || December 30, 2000 || Socorro || LINEAR || — || align=right | 5.1 km || 
|-id=139 bgcolor=#d6d6d6
| 252139 ||  || — || December 30, 2000 || Socorro || LINEAR || — || align=right | 5.6 km || 
|-id=140 bgcolor=#d6d6d6
| 252140 ||  || — || December 28, 2000 || Socorro || LINEAR || — || align=right | 5.3 km || 
|-id=141 bgcolor=#d6d6d6
| 252141 ||  || — || December 30, 2000 || Socorro || LINEAR || TIR || align=right | 4.5 km || 
|-id=142 bgcolor=#d6d6d6
| 252142 ||  || — || December 29, 2000 || Anderson Mesa || LONEOS || — || align=right | 4.7 km || 
|-id=143 bgcolor=#d6d6d6
| 252143 ||  || — || December 20, 2000 || Kitt Peak || DLS || — || align=right | 2.6 km || 
|-id=144 bgcolor=#fefefe
| 252144 ||  || — || January 4, 2001 || Socorro || LINEAR || FLO || align=right data-sort-value="0.99" | 990 m || 
|-id=145 bgcolor=#fefefe
| 252145 ||  || — || January 15, 2001 || Socorro || LINEAR || H || align=right data-sort-value="0.70" | 700 m || 
|-id=146 bgcolor=#fefefe
| 252146 ||  || — || January 6, 2001 || Socorro || LINEAR || H || align=right | 1.0 km || 
|-id=147 bgcolor=#d6d6d6
| 252147 || 2001 BP || — || January 17, 2001 || Oizumi || T. Kobayashi || HYG || align=right | 4.9 km || 
|-id=148 bgcolor=#fefefe
| 252148 ||  || — || January 16, 2001 || Kitt Peak || Spacewatch || — || align=right data-sort-value="0.89" | 890 m || 
|-id=149 bgcolor=#d6d6d6
| 252149 ||  || — || January 19, 2001 || Socorro || LINEAR || — || align=right | 4.3 km || 
|-id=150 bgcolor=#fefefe
| 252150 ||  || — || January 20, 2001 || Socorro || LINEAR || — || align=right | 1.5 km || 
|-id=151 bgcolor=#d6d6d6
| 252151 ||  || — || January 21, 2001 || Oizumi || T. Kobayashi || — || align=right | 3.0 km || 
|-id=152 bgcolor=#d6d6d6
| 252152 ||  || — || January 19, 2001 || Socorro || LINEAR || — || align=right | 4.1 km || 
|-id=153 bgcolor=#fefefe
| 252153 ||  || — || January 19, 2001 || Socorro || LINEAR || NYS || align=right data-sort-value="0.80" | 800 m || 
|-id=154 bgcolor=#fefefe
| 252154 ||  || — || January 20, 2001 || Socorro || LINEAR || — || align=right | 3.0 km || 
|-id=155 bgcolor=#d6d6d6
| 252155 ||  || — || January 21, 2001 || Socorro || LINEAR || — || align=right | 4.3 km || 
|-id=156 bgcolor=#fefefe
| 252156 ||  || — || January 16, 2001 || Uccle || T. Pauwels || — || align=right data-sort-value="0.96" | 960 m || 
|-id=157 bgcolor=#fefefe
| 252157 ||  || — || January 18, 2001 || Haleakala || NEAT || — || align=right | 1.3 km || 
|-id=158 bgcolor=#fefefe
| 252158 ||  || — || February 1, 2001 || Socorro || LINEAR || NYS || align=right | 1.1 km || 
|-id=159 bgcolor=#C2FFFF
| 252159 ||  || — || February 1, 2001 || Socorro || LINEAR || L4HEK || align=right | 17 km || 
|-id=160 bgcolor=#fefefe
| 252160 ||  || — || February 3, 2001 || Socorro || LINEAR || H || align=right data-sort-value="0.77" | 770 m || 
|-id=161 bgcolor=#d6d6d6
| 252161 ||  || — || February 1, 2001 || Anderson Mesa || LONEOS || — || align=right | 3.9 km || 
|-id=162 bgcolor=#fefefe
| 252162 ||  || — || February 1, 2001 || Anderson Mesa || LONEOS || — || align=right data-sort-value="0.89" | 890 m || 
|-id=163 bgcolor=#fefefe
| 252163 ||  || — || February 12, 2001 || Prescott || P. G. Comba || MAS || align=right data-sort-value="0.78" | 780 m || 
|-id=164 bgcolor=#fefefe
| 252164 ||  || — || February 5, 2001 || Socorro || LINEAR || PHO || align=right | 1.7 km || 
|-id=165 bgcolor=#d6d6d6
| 252165 ||  || — || February 13, 2001 || Socorro || LINEAR || — || align=right | 4.1 km || 
|-id=166 bgcolor=#FA8072
| 252166 ||  || — || February 3, 2001 || Socorro || LINEAR || H || align=right | 1.2 km || 
|-id=167 bgcolor=#fefefe
| 252167 ||  || — || February 15, 2001 || Nogales || Tenagra II Obs. || NYS || align=right data-sort-value="0.77" | 770 m || 
|-id=168 bgcolor=#d6d6d6
| 252168 ||  || — || February 15, 2001 || Socorro || LINEAR || — || align=right | 7.3 km || 
|-id=169 bgcolor=#d6d6d6
| 252169 ||  || — || February 16, 2001 || Kitt Peak || Spacewatch || HYG || align=right | 4.4 km || 
|-id=170 bgcolor=#d6d6d6
| 252170 ||  || — || February 16, 2001 || Socorro || LINEAR || — || align=right | 5.1 km || 
|-id=171 bgcolor=#fefefe
| 252171 ||  || — || February 17, 2001 || Socorro || LINEAR || H || align=right data-sort-value="0.69" | 690 m || 
|-id=172 bgcolor=#fefefe
| 252172 ||  || — || February 17, 2001 || Socorro || LINEAR || — || align=right | 1.2 km || 
|-id=173 bgcolor=#C2FFFF
| 252173 ||  || — || February 17, 2001 || Socorro || LINEAR || L4 || align=right | 17 km || 
|-id=174 bgcolor=#fefefe
| 252174 ||  || — || February 16, 2001 || Socorro || LINEAR || — || align=right | 1.2 km || 
|-id=175 bgcolor=#d6d6d6
| 252175 ||  || — || February 16, 2001 || Socorro || LINEAR || — || align=right | 4.7 km || 
|-id=176 bgcolor=#d6d6d6
| 252176 ||  || — || February 16, 2001 || Socorro || LINEAR || LIX || align=right | 7.1 km || 
|-id=177 bgcolor=#fefefe
| 252177 ||  || — || February 17, 2001 || Socorro || LINEAR || NYS || align=right | 1.0 km || 
|-id=178 bgcolor=#d6d6d6
| 252178 ||  || — || February 17, 2001 || Socorro || LINEAR || — || align=right | 6.1 km || 
|-id=179 bgcolor=#C2FFFF
| 252179 ||  || — || February 19, 2001 || Socorro || LINEAR || L4 || align=right | 12 km || 
|-id=180 bgcolor=#fefefe
| 252180 ||  || — || February 20, 2001 || Socorro || LINEAR || FLO || align=right data-sort-value="0.89" | 890 m || 
|-id=181 bgcolor=#d6d6d6
| 252181 ||  || — || February 22, 2001 || Nogales || Tenagra II Obs. || HYG || align=right | 3.8 km || 
|-id=182 bgcolor=#d6d6d6
| 252182 ||  || — || February 21, 2001 || Kitt Peak || Spacewatch || — || align=right | 3.3 km || 
|-id=183 bgcolor=#d6d6d6
| 252183 ||  || — || February 21, 2001 || Kitt Peak || Spacewatch || THM || align=right | 3.9 km || 
|-id=184 bgcolor=#fefefe
| 252184 ||  || — || February 20, 2001 || Socorro || LINEAR || V || align=right data-sort-value="0.84" | 840 m || 
|-id=185 bgcolor=#fefefe
| 252185 ||  || — || February 20, 2001 || Haleakala || NEAT || — || align=right | 1.2 km || 
|-id=186 bgcolor=#d6d6d6
| 252186 ||  || — || February 21, 2001 || Kitt Peak || Spacewatch || — || align=right | 4.9 km || 
|-id=187 bgcolor=#fefefe
| 252187 ||  || — || March 1, 2001 || Socorro || LINEAR || — || align=right | 1.1 km || 
|-id=188 bgcolor=#d6d6d6
| 252188 ||  || — || March 2, 2001 || Anderson Mesa || LONEOS || — || align=right | 3.3 km || 
|-id=189 bgcolor=#d6d6d6
| 252189 ||  || — || March 15, 2001 || Socorro || LINEAR || — || align=right | 5.3 km || 
|-id=190 bgcolor=#fefefe
| 252190 ||  || — || March 15, 2001 || Socorro || LINEAR || PHO || align=right | 1.8 km || 
|-id=191 bgcolor=#fefefe
| 252191 ||  || — || March 15, 2001 || Anderson Mesa || LONEOS || — || align=right | 1.1 km || 
|-id=192 bgcolor=#FA8072
| 252192 ||  || — || March 18, 2001 || Socorro || LINEAR || — || align=right | 1.3 km || 
|-id=193 bgcolor=#fefefe
| 252193 ||  || — || March 20, 2001 || Haleakala || NEAT || H || align=right | 1.0 km || 
|-id=194 bgcolor=#fefefe
| 252194 ||  || — || March 19, 2001 || Anderson Mesa || LONEOS || NYS || align=right | 1.0 km || 
|-id=195 bgcolor=#d6d6d6
| 252195 ||  || — || March 21, 2001 || Kitt Peak || Spacewatch || — || align=right | 4.1 km || 
|-id=196 bgcolor=#fefefe
| 252196 ||  || — || March 18, 2001 || Socorro || LINEAR || — || align=right | 1.2 km || 
|-id=197 bgcolor=#d6d6d6
| 252197 ||  || — || March 19, 2001 || Socorro || LINEAR || EUP || align=right | 5.3 km || 
|-id=198 bgcolor=#fefefe
| 252198 ||  || — || March 19, 2001 || Socorro || LINEAR || NYS || align=right | 1.0 km || 
|-id=199 bgcolor=#d6d6d6
| 252199 ||  || — || March 19, 2001 || Socorro || LINEAR || — || align=right | 4.6 km || 
|-id=200 bgcolor=#fefefe
| 252200 ||  || — || March 26, 2001 || Kitt Peak || Spacewatch || — || align=right data-sort-value="0.93" | 930 m || 
|}

252201–252300 

|-bgcolor=#fefefe
| 252201 ||  || — || March 26, 2001 || Kitt Peak || Spacewatch || — || align=right data-sort-value="0.84" | 840 m || 
|-id=202 bgcolor=#fefefe
| 252202 ||  || — || March 16, 2001 || Socorro || LINEAR || — || align=right | 1.4 km || 
|-id=203 bgcolor=#d6d6d6
| 252203 ||  || — || March 18, 2001 || Anderson Mesa || LONEOS || HYG || align=right | 4.6 km || 
|-id=204 bgcolor=#fefefe
| 252204 ||  || — || March 18, 2001 || Socorro || LINEAR || — || align=right | 1.1 km || 
|-id=205 bgcolor=#fefefe
| 252205 ||  || — || March 20, 2001 || Haleakala || NEAT || — || align=right | 1.3 km || 
|-id=206 bgcolor=#fefefe
| 252206 ||  || — || March 20, 2001 || Haleakala || NEAT || — || align=right | 1.5 km || 
|-id=207 bgcolor=#d6d6d6
| 252207 ||  || — || March 21, 2001 || Anderson Mesa || LONEOS || TIR || align=right | 4.2 km || 
|-id=208 bgcolor=#fefefe
| 252208 ||  || — || March 22, 2001 || Cima Ekar || ADAS || NYS || align=right data-sort-value="0.68" | 680 m || 
|-id=209 bgcolor=#d6d6d6
| 252209 ||  || — || March 23, 2001 || Socorro || LINEAR || — || align=right | 6.1 km || 
|-id=210 bgcolor=#fefefe
| 252210 ||  || — || March 20, 2001 || Anderson Mesa || LONEOS || PHO || align=right | 1.5 km || 
|-id=211 bgcolor=#fefefe
| 252211 ||  || — || March 19, 2001 || Socorro || LINEAR || NYS || align=right | 1.1 km || 
|-id=212 bgcolor=#fefefe
| 252212 ||  || — || April 21, 2001 || Socorro || LINEAR || — || align=right | 3.5 km || 
|-id=213 bgcolor=#fefefe
| 252213 ||  || — || April 28, 2001 || Kitt Peak || Spacewatch || NYS || align=right data-sort-value="0.99" | 990 m || 
|-id=214 bgcolor=#fefefe
| 252214 ||  || — || April 18, 2001 || Socorro || LINEAR || — || align=right | 1.2 km || 
|-id=215 bgcolor=#fefefe
| 252215 ||  || — || April 24, 2001 || Kitt Peak || Spacewatch || — || align=right | 1.1 km || 
|-id=216 bgcolor=#fefefe
| 252216 ||  || — || May 17, 2001 || Socorro || LINEAR || H || align=right data-sort-value="0.75" | 750 m || 
|-id=217 bgcolor=#E9E9E9
| 252217 ||  || — || May 17, 2001 || Socorro || LINEAR || — || align=right | 1.3 km || 
|-id=218 bgcolor=#fefefe
| 252218 ||  || — || May 17, 2001 || Socorro || LINEAR || — || align=right | 1.0 km || 
|-id=219 bgcolor=#d6d6d6
| 252219 ||  || — || May 25, 2001 || Kitt Peak || Spacewatch || LIX || align=right | 5.9 km || 
|-id=220 bgcolor=#E9E9E9
| 252220 ||  || — || June 19, 2001 || Haleakala || NEAT || — || align=right | 3.2 km || 
|-id=221 bgcolor=#E9E9E9
| 252221 ||  || — || June 27, 2001 || Palomar || NEAT || — || align=right | 2.0 km || 
|-id=222 bgcolor=#E9E9E9
| 252222 ||  || — || July 13, 2001 || Palomar || NEAT || — || align=right | 2.0 km || 
|-id=223 bgcolor=#E9E9E9
| 252223 ||  || — || July 13, 2001 || Palomar || NEAT || — || align=right | 1.9 km || 
|-id=224 bgcolor=#d6d6d6
| 252224 ||  || — || July 14, 2001 || Palomar || NEAT || 3:2 || align=right | 6.5 km || 
|-id=225 bgcolor=#E9E9E9
| 252225 ||  || — || July 17, 2001 || Anderson Mesa || LONEOS || — || align=right | 3.0 km || 
|-id=226 bgcolor=#E9E9E9
| 252226 ||  || — || July 21, 2001 || Anderson Mesa || LONEOS || JUN || align=right | 1.4 km || 
|-id=227 bgcolor=#E9E9E9
| 252227 ||  || — || July 18, 2001 || Palomar || NEAT || — || align=right | 3.0 km || 
|-id=228 bgcolor=#E9E9E9
| 252228 ||  || — || July 19, 2001 || Haleakala || NEAT || JUN || align=right | 1.4 km || 
|-id=229 bgcolor=#E9E9E9
| 252229 ||  || — || July 24, 2001 || Palomar || NEAT || — || align=right | 3.4 km || 
|-id=230 bgcolor=#E9E9E9
| 252230 ||  || — || July 22, 2001 || Palomar || NEAT || RAF || align=right | 1.7 km || 
|-id=231 bgcolor=#E9E9E9
| 252231 ||  || — || July 19, 2001 || Palomar || NEAT || — || align=right | 1.7 km || 
|-id=232 bgcolor=#E9E9E9
| 252232 ||  || — || August 3, 2001 || Haleakala || NEAT || — || align=right | 2.7 km || 
|-id=233 bgcolor=#E9E9E9
| 252233 ||  || — || August 9, 2001 || Palomar || NEAT || EUN || align=right | 1.5 km || 
|-id=234 bgcolor=#E9E9E9
| 252234 ||  || — || August 10, 2001 || Palomar || NEAT || MAR || align=right | 2.0 km || 
|-id=235 bgcolor=#E9E9E9
| 252235 ||  || — || August 10, 2001 || Palomar || NEAT || — || align=right | 2.1 km || 
|-id=236 bgcolor=#E9E9E9
| 252236 ||  || — || August 10, 2001 || Palomar || NEAT || — || align=right | 1.4 km || 
|-id=237 bgcolor=#E9E9E9
| 252237 ||  || — || August 11, 2001 || Palomar || NEAT || — || align=right | 2.7 km || 
|-id=238 bgcolor=#E9E9E9
| 252238 ||  || — || August 11, 2001 || Palomar || NEAT || — || align=right | 3.1 km || 
|-id=239 bgcolor=#E9E9E9
| 252239 ||  || — || August 12, 2001 || Palomar || NEAT || — || align=right | 2.3 km || 
|-id=240 bgcolor=#E9E9E9
| 252240 ||  || — || August 3, 2001 || Haleakala || NEAT || JUN || align=right | 2.1 km || 
|-id=241 bgcolor=#E9E9E9
| 252241 ||  || — || August 11, 2001 || Haleakala || NEAT || — || align=right | 2.4 km || 
|-id=242 bgcolor=#E9E9E9
| 252242 ||  || — || August 16, 2001 || Socorro || LINEAR || RAF || align=right | 1.4 km || 
|-id=243 bgcolor=#E9E9E9
| 252243 ||  || — || August 16, 2001 || Socorro || LINEAR || — || align=right | 2.5 km || 
|-id=244 bgcolor=#FA8072
| 252244 ||  || — || August 19, 2001 || Socorro || LINEAR || — || align=right | 3.0 km || 
|-id=245 bgcolor=#d6d6d6
| 252245 ||  || — || August 16, 2001 || Socorro || LINEAR || 3:2 || align=right | 5.9 km || 
|-id=246 bgcolor=#E9E9E9
| 252246 ||  || — || August 17, 2001 || Socorro || LINEAR || JUN || align=right | 1.7 km || 
|-id=247 bgcolor=#E9E9E9
| 252247 ||  || — || August 22, 2001 || Kitt Peak || Spacewatch || — || align=right data-sort-value="0.91" | 910 m || 
|-id=248 bgcolor=#E9E9E9
| 252248 ||  || — || August 16, 2001 || Palomar || NEAT || ADE || align=right | 3.1 km || 
|-id=249 bgcolor=#E9E9E9
| 252249 ||  || — || August 19, 2001 || Socorro || LINEAR || — || align=right | 3.7 km || 
|-id=250 bgcolor=#E9E9E9
| 252250 ||  || — || August 23, 2001 || Socorro || LINEAR || BRU || align=right | 5.2 km || 
|-id=251 bgcolor=#E9E9E9
| 252251 ||  || — || August 21, 2001 || Haleakala || NEAT || — || align=right | 2.4 km || 
|-id=252 bgcolor=#E9E9E9
| 252252 ||  || — || August 17, 2001 || Socorro || LINEAR || — || align=right | 2.2 km || 
|-id=253 bgcolor=#E9E9E9
| 252253 ||  || — || August 19, 2001 || Socorro || LINEAR || EUN || align=right | 2.4 km || 
|-id=254 bgcolor=#E9E9E9
| 252254 ||  || — || August 20, 2001 || Socorro || LINEAR || — || align=right | 2.4 km || 
|-id=255 bgcolor=#E9E9E9
| 252255 ||  || — || August 22, 2001 || Socorro || LINEAR || — || align=right | 3.3 km || 
|-id=256 bgcolor=#E9E9E9
| 252256 ||  || — || August 23, 2001 || Socorro || LINEAR || — || align=right | 1.8 km || 
|-id=257 bgcolor=#E9E9E9
| 252257 ||  || — || August 26, 2001 || Socorro || LINEAR || — || align=right | 4.7 km || 
|-id=258 bgcolor=#E9E9E9
| 252258 ||  || — || August 27, 2001 || Ondřejov || P. Kušnirák || — || align=right | 2.2 km || 
|-id=259 bgcolor=#E9E9E9
| 252259 ||  || — || August 23, 2001 || Anderson Mesa || LONEOS || — || align=right | 3.5 km || 
|-id=260 bgcolor=#E9E9E9
| 252260 ||  || — || August 23, 2001 || Anderson Mesa || LONEOS || — || align=right | 1.7 km || 
|-id=261 bgcolor=#E9E9E9
| 252261 ||  || — || August 23, 2001 || Anderson Mesa || LONEOS || — || align=right | 2.5 km || 
|-id=262 bgcolor=#E9E9E9
| 252262 ||  || — || August 22, 2001 || Socorro || LINEAR || — || align=right | 2.3 km || 
|-id=263 bgcolor=#E9E9E9
| 252263 ||  || — || August 26, 2001 || Palomar || NEAT || ADE || align=right | 3.4 km || 
|-id=264 bgcolor=#E9E9E9
| 252264 ||  || — || August 21, 2001 || Haleakala || NEAT || — || align=right | 3.3 km || 
|-id=265 bgcolor=#E9E9E9
| 252265 ||  || — || August 22, 2001 || Socorro || LINEAR || — || align=right | 3.2 km || 
|-id=266 bgcolor=#E9E9E9
| 252266 ||  || — || August 22, 2001 || Socorro || LINEAR || — || align=right | 3.8 km || 
|-id=267 bgcolor=#E9E9E9
| 252267 ||  || — || August 22, 2001 || Palomar || NEAT || HNS || align=right | 1.7 km || 
|-id=268 bgcolor=#E9E9E9
| 252268 ||  || — || August 22, 2001 || Socorro || LINEAR || MAR || align=right | 1.5 km || 
|-id=269 bgcolor=#E9E9E9
| 252269 ||  || — || August 22, 2001 || Socorro || LINEAR || — || align=right | 2.1 km || 
|-id=270 bgcolor=#E9E9E9
| 252270 ||  || — || August 22, 2001 || Palomar || NEAT || — || align=right | 3.4 km || 
|-id=271 bgcolor=#E9E9E9
| 252271 ||  || — || August 22, 2001 || Palomar || NEAT || JUN || align=right | 1.4 km || 
|-id=272 bgcolor=#E9E9E9
| 252272 ||  || — || August 24, 2001 || Anderson Mesa || LONEOS || — || align=right | 2.1 km || 
|-id=273 bgcolor=#E9E9E9
| 252273 ||  || — || August 24, 2001 || Anderson Mesa || LONEOS || — || align=right | 2.4 km || 
|-id=274 bgcolor=#d6d6d6
| 252274 ||  || — || August 24, 2001 || Anderson Mesa || LONEOS || HIL3:2 || align=right | 8.8 km || 
|-id=275 bgcolor=#E9E9E9
| 252275 ||  || — || August 24, 2001 || Anderson Mesa || LONEOS || EUN || align=right | 1.9 km || 
|-id=276 bgcolor=#E9E9E9
| 252276 ||  || — || August 24, 2001 || Socorro || LINEAR || — || align=right | 1.7 km || 
|-id=277 bgcolor=#E9E9E9
| 252277 ||  || — || August 24, 2001 || Socorro || LINEAR || — || align=right | 2.6 km || 
|-id=278 bgcolor=#E9E9E9
| 252278 ||  || — || August 24, 2001 || Socorro || LINEAR || DOR || align=right | 4.2 km || 
|-id=279 bgcolor=#E9E9E9
| 252279 ||  || — || August 24, 2001 || Socorro || LINEAR || EUN || align=right | 1.5 km || 
|-id=280 bgcolor=#E9E9E9
| 252280 ||  || — || August 25, 2001 || Socorro || LINEAR || POS || align=right | 3.8 km || 
|-id=281 bgcolor=#E9E9E9
| 252281 ||  || — || August 25, 2001 || Anderson Mesa || LONEOS || — || align=right | 1.8 km || 
|-id=282 bgcolor=#E9E9E9
| 252282 ||  || — || August 19, 2001 || Socorro || LINEAR || JUN || align=right | 1.4 km || 
|-id=283 bgcolor=#E9E9E9
| 252283 ||  || — || August 19, 2001 || Anderson Mesa || LONEOS || — || align=right | 3.3 km || 
|-id=284 bgcolor=#E9E9E9
| 252284 ||  || — || August 19, 2001 || Socorro || LINEAR || — || align=right | 2.0 km || 
|-id=285 bgcolor=#E9E9E9
| 252285 ||  || — || August 19, 2001 || Socorro || LINEAR || — || align=right | 2.0 km || 
|-id=286 bgcolor=#E9E9E9
| 252286 ||  || — || August 17, 2001 || Socorro || LINEAR || — || align=right | 2.0 km || 
|-id=287 bgcolor=#E9E9E9
| 252287 ||  || — || August 16, 2001 || Palomar || NEAT || MAR || align=right | 1.4 km || 
|-id=288 bgcolor=#E9E9E9
| 252288 ||  || — || August 16, 2001 || Palomar || NEAT || — || align=right | 1.9 km || 
|-id=289 bgcolor=#E9E9E9
| 252289 ||  || — || August 31, 2001 || Palomar || NEAT || — || align=right | 3.8 km || 
|-id=290 bgcolor=#E9E9E9
| 252290 ||  || — || August 19, 2001 || Cerro Tololo || M. W. Buie || — || align=right | 1.6 km || 
|-id=291 bgcolor=#E9E9E9
| 252291 ||  || — || August 27, 2001 || Anderson Mesa || LONEOS || JUN || align=right | 1.4 km || 
|-id=292 bgcolor=#E9E9E9
| 252292 ||  || — || September 8, 2001 || Socorro || LINEAR || EUN || align=right | 1.9 km || 
|-id=293 bgcolor=#E9E9E9
| 252293 ||  || — || September 9, 2001 || Desert Eagle || W. K. Y. Yeung || — || align=right | 1.7 km || 
|-id=294 bgcolor=#E9E9E9
| 252294 ||  || — || September 10, 2001 || Desert Eagle || W. K. Y. Yeung || — || align=right | 2.2 km || 
|-id=295 bgcolor=#E9E9E9
| 252295 ||  || — || September 8, 2001 || Socorro || LINEAR || — || align=right | 2.9 km || 
|-id=296 bgcolor=#E9E9E9
| 252296 ||  || — || September 10, 2001 || Socorro || LINEAR || — || align=right | 3.1 km || 
|-id=297 bgcolor=#E9E9E9
| 252297 ||  || — || September 10, 2001 || Socorro || LINEAR || — || align=right | 3.0 km || 
|-id=298 bgcolor=#E9E9E9
| 252298 ||  || — || September 7, 2001 || Socorro || LINEAR || — || align=right | 1.8 km || 
|-id=299 bgcolor=#E9E9E9
| 252299 ||  || — || September 7, 2001 || Socorro || LINEAR || MAR || align=right | 1.5 km || 
|-id=300 bgcolor=#E9E9E9
| 252300 ||  || — || September 7, 2001 || Socorro || LINEAR || — || align=right | 2.2 km || 
|}

252301–252400 

|-bgcolor=#E9E9E9
| 252301 ||  || — || September 8, 2001 || Socorro || LINEAR || — || align=right | 2.2 km || 
|-id=302 bgcolor=#E9E9E9
| 252302 ||  || — || September 11, 2001 || Socorro || LINEAR || — || align=right | 2.5 km || 
|-id=303 bgcolor=#E9E9E9
| 252303 ||  || — || September 11, 2001 || Socorro || LINEAR || — || align=right | 2.0 km || 
|-id=304 bgcolor=#E9E9E9
| 252304 ||  || — || September 12, 2001 || Socorro || LINEAR || INO || align=right | 1.6 km || 
|-id=305 bgcolor=#E9E9E9
| 252305 ||  || — || September 12, 2001 || Socorro || LINEAR || — || align=right | 3.0 km || 
|-id=306 bgcolor=#E9E9E9
| 252306 ||  || — || September 11, 2001 || Anderson Mesa || LONEOS || JUN || align=right | 1.8 km || 
|-id=307 bgcolor=#E9E9E9
| 252307 ||  || — || September 11, 2001 || Anderson Mesa || LONEOS || — || align=right | 1.7 km || 
|-id=308 bgcolor=#E9E9E9
| 252308 ||  || — || September 11, 2001 || Anderson Mesa || LONEOS || — || align=right | 2.6 km || 
|-id=309 bgcolor=#E9E9E9
| 252309 ||  || — || September 11, 2001 || Anderson Mesa || LONEOS || — || align=right | 3.9 km || 
|-id=310 bgcolor=#E9E9E9
| 252310 ||  || — || September 12, 2001 || Kitt Peak || Spacewatch || WIT || align=right | 1.2 km || 
|-id=311 bgcolor=#E9E9E9
| 252311 ||  || — || September 12, 2001 || Kitt Peak || Spacewatch || MAR || align=right | 1.5 km || 
|-id=312 bgcolor=#d6d6d6
| 252312 ||  || — || September 12, 2001 || Socorro || LINEAR || SHU3:2 || align=right | 8.0 km || 
|-id=313 bgcolor=#E9E9E9
| 252313 ||  || — || September 12, 2001 || Socorro || LINEAR || EUN || align=right | 1.6 km || 
|-id=314 bgcolor=#E9E9E9
| 252314 ||  || — || September 12, 2001 || Socorro || LINEAR || — || align=right | 2.5 km || 
|-id=315 bgcolor=#E9E9E9
| 252315 ||  || — || September 12, 2001 || Socorro || LINEAR || — || align=right | 2.0 km || 
|-id=316 bgcolor=#E9E9E9
| 252316 ||  || — || September 12, 2001 || Socorro || LINEAR || MIS || align=right | 2.2 km || 
|-id=317 bgcolor=#E9E9E9
| 252317 ||  || — || September 12, 2001 || Socorro || LINEAR || — || align=right | 2.0 km || 
|-id=318 bgcolor=#E9E9E9
| 252318 ||  || — || September 12, 2001 || Socorro || LINEAR || — || align=right | 2.0 km || 
|-id=319 bgcolor=#E9E9E9
| 252319 ||  || — || September 12, 2001 || Socorro || LINEAR || — || align=right | 1.8 km || 
|-id=320 bgcolor=#E9E9E9
| 252320 ||  || — || September 8, 2001 || Socorro || LINEAR || — || align=right | 4.4 km || 
|-id=321 bgcolor=#E9E9E9
| 252321 ||  || — || September 10, 2001 || Palomar || NEAT || — || align=right | 2.8 km || 
|-id=322 bgcolor=#E9E9E9
| 252322 ||  || — || September 9, 2001 || Anderson Mesa || LONEOS || MAR || align=right | 1.5 km || 
|-id=323 bgcolor=#E9E9E9
| 252323 ||  || — || September 10, 2001 || Palomar || NEAT || — || align=right | 3.5 km || 
|-id=324 bgcolor=#E9E9E9
| 252324 ||  || — || September 17, 2001 || Desert Eagle || W. K. Y. Yeung || — || align=right | 2.9 km || 
|-id=325 bgcolor=#E9E9E9
| 252325 ||  || — || September 16, 2001 || Socorro || LINEAR || — || align=right | 2.3 km || 
|-id=326 bgcolor=#E9E9E9
| 252326 ||  || — || September 16, 2001 || Socorro || LINEAR || — || align=right | 2.2 km || 
|-id=327 bgcolor=#E9E9E9
| 252327 ||  || — || September 16, 2001 || Socorro || LINEAR || — || align=right | 3.0 km || 
|-id=328 bgcolor=#E9E9E9
| 252328 ||  || — || September 16, 2001 || Socorro || LINEAR || GEF || align=right | 1.7 km || 
|-id=329 bgcolor=#E9E9E9
| 252329 ||  || — || September 16, 2001 || Socorro || LINEAR || — || align=right | 3.5 km || 
|-id=330 bgcolor=#E9E9E9
| 252330 ||  || — || September 19, 2001 || Anderson Mesa || LONEOS || — || align=right | 2.1 km || 
|-id=331 bgcolor=#E9E9E9
| 252331 ||  || — || September 20, 2001 || Socorro || LINEAR || — || align=right | 2.9 km || 
|-id=332 bgcolor=#E9E9E9
| 252332 ||  || — || September 20, 2001 || Socorro || LINEAR || — || align=right | 3.7 km || 
|-id=333 bgcolor=#E9E9E9
| 252333 ||  || — || September 20, 2001 || Socorro || LINEAR || — || align=right | 2.4 km || 
|-id=334 bgcolor=#E9E9E9
| 252334 ||  || — || September 20, 2001 || Socorro || LINEAR || — || align=right | 2.0 km || 
|-id=335 bgcolor=#E9E9E9
| 252335 ||  || — || September 20, 2001 || Socorro || LINEAR || — || align=right | 2.4 km || 
|-id=336 bgcolor=#E9E9E9
| 252336 ||  || — || September 20, 2001 || Socorro || LINEAR || — || align=right | 2.0 km || 
|-id=337 bgcolor=#E9E9E9
| 252337 ||  || — || September 20, 2001 || Desert Eagle || W. K. Y. Yeung || — || align=right | 2.2 km || 
|-id=338 bgcolor=#E9E9E9
| 252338 ||  || — || September 16, 2001 || Socorro || LINEAR || ADE || align=right | 2.5 km || 
|-id=339 bgcolor=#E9E9E9
| 252339 ||  || — || September 16, 2001 || Socorro || LINEAR || MRX || align=right | 1.4 km || 
|-id=340 bgcolor=#E9E9E9
| 252340 ||  || — || September 16, 2001 || Socorro || LINEAR || — || align=right | 1.8 km || 
|-id=341 bgcolor=#E9E9E9
| 252341 ||  || — || September 16, 2001 || Socorro || LINEAR || — || align=right | 2.8 km || 
|-id=342 bgcolor=#E9E9E9
| 252342 ||  || — || September 16, 2001 || Socorro || LINEAR || — || align=right | 2.3 km || 
|-id=343 bgcolor=#E9E9E9
| 252343 ||  || — || September 16, 2001 || Socorro || LINEAR || CLO || align=right | 2.9 km || 
|-id=344 bgcolor=#E9E9E9
| 252344 ||  || — || September 16, 2001 || Socorro || LINEAR || — || align=right | 2.3 km || 
|-id=345 bgcolor=#E9E9E9
| 252345 ||  || — || September 16, 2001 || Socorro || LINEAR || — || align=right | 2.8 km || 
|-id=346 bgcolor=#E9E9E9
| 252346 ||  || — || September 16, 2001 || Socorro || LINEAR || DOR || align=right | 3.1 km || 
|-id=347 bgcolor=#E9E9E9
| 252347 ||  || — || September 17, 2001 || Socorro || LINEAR || — || align=right | 2.5 km || 
|-id=348 bgcolor=#E9E9E9
| 252348 ||  || — || September 17, 2001 || Socorro || LINEAR || — || align=right | 3.3 km || 
|-id=349 bgcolor=#E9E9E9
| 252349 ||  || — || September 17, 2001 || Socorro || LINEAR || — || align=right | 3.2 km || 
|-id=350 bgcolor=#E9E9E9
| 252350 ||  || — || September 17, 2001 || Socorro || LINEAR || — || align=right | 4.0 km || 
|-id=351 bgcolor=#E9E9E9
| 252351 ||  || — || September 17, 2001 || Socorro || LINEAR || — || align=right | 3.0 km || 
|-id=352 bgcolor=#E9E9E9
| 252352 ||  || — || September 17, 2001 || Socorro || LINEAR || MRX || align=right | 1.4 km || 
|-id=353 bgcolor=#E9E9E9
| 252353 ||  || — || September 17, 2001 || Socorro || LINEAR || — || align=right | 3.0 km || 
|-id=354 bgcolor=#E9E9E9
| 252354 ||  || — || September 16, 2001 || Socorro || LINEAR || GAL || align=right | 1.8 km || 
|-id=355 bgcolor=#E9E9E9
| 252355 ||  || — || September 19, 2001 || Socorro || LINEAR || — || align=right | 1.8 km || 
|-id=356 bgcolor=#E9E9E9
| 252356 ||  || — || September 19, 2001 || Socorro || LINEAR || — || align=right | 1.9 km || 
|-id=357 bgcolor=#E9E9E9
| 252357 ||  || — || September 19, 2001 || Socorro || LINEAR || — || align=right | 1.7 km || 
|-id=358 bgcolor=#E9E9E9
| 252358 ||  || — || September 19, 2001 || Socorro || LINEAR || — || align=right | 1.7 km || 
|-id=359 bgcolor=#E9E9E9
| 252359 ||  || — || September 19, 2001 || Socorro || LINEAR || — || align=right | 2.8 km || 
|-id=360 bgcolor=#E9E9E9
| 252360 ||  || — || September 19, 2001 || Socorro || LINEAR || — || align=right | 1.9 km || 
|-id=361 bgcolor=#E9E9E9
| 252361 ||  || — || September 19, 2001 || Socorro || LINEAR || — || align=right | 2.7 km || 
|-id=362 bgcolor=#E9E9E9
| 252362 ||  || — || September 19, 2001 || Socorro || LINEAR || NEM || align=right | 2.7 km || 
|-id=363 bgcolor=#E9E9E9
| 252363 ||  || — || September 19, 2001 || Socorro || LINEAR || — || align=right | 1.9 km || 
|-id=364 bgcolor=#E9E9E9
| 252364 ||  || — || September 19, 2001 || Socorro || LINEAR || — || align=right | 2.8 km || 
|-id=365 bgcolor=#E9E9E9
| 252365 ||  || — || September 19, 2001 || Socorro || LINEAR || INO || align=right | 1.4 km || 
|-id=366 bgcolor=#E9E9E9
| 252366 ||  || — || September 19, 2001 || Socorro || LINEAR || ADE || align=right | 3.5 km || 
|-id=367 bgcolor=#E9E9E9
| 252367 ||  || — || September 19, 2001 || Socorro || LINEAR || — || align=right | 2.0 km || 
|-id=368 bgcolor=#E9E9E9
| 252368 ||  || — || September 19, 2001 || Socorro || LINEAR || — || align=right | 2.6 km || 
|-id=369 bgcolor=#E9E9E9
| 252369 ||  || — || September 19, 2001 || Socorro || LINEAR || GEF || align=right | 1.4 km || 
|-id=370 bgcolor=#E9E9E9
| 252370 ||  || — || September 19, 2001 || Socorro || LINEAR || — || align=right | 2.8 km || 
|-id=371 bgcolor=#E9E9E9
| 252371 ||  || — || September 20, 2001 || Socorro || LINEAR || — || align=right | 1.7 km || 
|-id=372 bgcolor=#E9E9E9
| 252372 ||  || — || September 25, 2001 || Desert Eagle || W. K. Y. Yeung || — || align=right | 3.2 km || 
|-id=373 bgcolor=#FFC2E0
| 252373 ||  || — || September 26, 2001 || Socorro || LINEAR || APO +1km || align=right data-sort-value="0.84" | 840 m || 
|-id=374 bgcolor=#E9E9E9
| 252374 ||  || — || September 20, 2001 || Socorro || LINEAR || — || align=right | 2.5 km || 
|-id=375 bgcolor=#E9E9E9
| 252375 ||  || — || September 21, 2001 || Anderson Mesa || LONEOS || — || align=right | 2.9 km || 
|-id=376 bgcolor=#E9E9E9
| 252376 ||  || — || September 29, 2001 || Palomar || NEAT || — || align=right | 1.7 km || 
|-id=377 bgcolor=#E9E9E9
| 252377 ||  || — || September 16, 2001 || Socorro || LINEAR || — || align=right | 2.0 km || 
|-id=378 bgcolor=#E9E9E9
| 252378 ||  || — || September 20, 2001 || Socorro || LINEAR || — || align=right | 2.3 km || 
|-id=379 bgcolor=#E9E9E9
| 252379 ||  || — || September 21, 2001 || Socorro || LINEAR || GEF || align=right | 1.7 km || 
|-id=380 bgcolor=#E9E9E9
| 252380 ||  || — || September 21, 2001 || Socorro || LINEAR || — || align=right | 2.2 km || 
|-id=381 bgcolor=#E9E9E9
| 252381 ||  || — || September 21, 2001 || Socorro || LINEAR || — || align=right | 2.2 km || 
|-id=382 bgcolor=#E9E9E9
| 252382 ||  || — || September 25, 2001 || Socorro || LINEAR || — || align=right | 2.2 km || 
|-id=383 bgcolor=#E9E9E9
| 252383 ||  || — || September 16, 2001 || Socorro || LINEAR || EUN || align=right | 1.8 km || 
|-id=384 bgcolor=#E9E9E9
| 252384 ||  || — || September 18, 2001 || Kitt Peak || Spacewatch || ADE || align=right | 3.4 km || 
|-id=385 bgcolor=#E9E9E9
| 252385 ||  || — || September 19, 2001 || Socorro || LINEAR || — || align=right | 3.0 km || 
|-id=386 bgcolor=#E9E9E9
| 252386 ||  || — || September 21, 2001 || Kitt Peak || Spacewatch || — || align=right | 1.7 km || 
|-id=387 bgcolor=#E9E9E9
| 252387 ||  || — || September 19, 2001 || Apache Point || SDSS || EUN || align=right | 1.5 km || 
|-id=388 bgcolor=#E9E9E9
| 252388 ||  || — || September 18, 2001 || Anderson Mesa || LONEOS || — || align=right | 2.4 km || 
|-id=389 bgcolor=#E9E9E9
| 252389 || 2001 TT || — || October 6, 2001 || Eskridge || Farpoint Obs. || BAR || align=right | 2.6 km || 
|-id=390 bgcolor=#E9E9E9
| 252390 ||  || — || October 10, 2001 || Palomar || NEAT || EUN || align=right | 1.7 km || 
|-id=391 bgcolor=#E9E9E9
| 252391 ||  || — || October 13, 2001 || Socorro || LINEAR || EUN || align=right | 1.4 km || 
|-id=392 bgcolor=#E9E9E9
| 252392 ||  || — || October 11, 2001 || Socorro || LINEAR || GEF || align=right | 1.9 km || 
|-id=393 bgcolor=#E9E9E9
| 252393 ||  || — || October 9, 2001 || Socorro || LINEAR || — || align=right | 3.0 km || 
|-id=394 bgcolor=#E9E9E9
| 252394 ||  || — || October 14, 2001 || Socorro || LINEAR || EUN || align=right | 1.9 km || 
|-id=395 bgcolor=#E9E9E9
| 252395 ||  || — || October 14, 2001 || Socorro || LINEAR || — || align=right | 3.9 km || 
|-id=396 bgcolor=#E9E9E9
| 252396 ||  || — || October 14, 2001 || Socorro || LINEAR || — || align=right | 4.5 km || 
|-id=397 bgcolor=#E9E9E9
| 252397 ||  || — || October 14, 2001 || Socorro || LINEAR || — || align=right | 3.3 km || 
|-id=398 bgcolor=#E9E9E9
| 252398 ||  || — || October 14, 2001 || Socorro || LINEAR || — || align=right | 3.8 km || 
|-id=399 bgcolor=#FFC2E0
| 252399 ||  || — || October 11, 2001 || Socorro || LINEAR || ATEPHA || align=right data-sort-value="0.29" | 290 m || 
|-id=400 bgcolor=#E9E9E9
| 252400 ||  || — || October 11, 2001 || Kitt Peak || Spacewatch || — || align=right | 1.7 km || 
|}

252401–252500 

|-bgcolor=#E9E9E9
| 252401 ||  || — || October 9, 2001 || Kitt Peak || Spacewatch || PAD || align=right | 2.6 km || 
|-id=402 bgcolor=#E9E9E9
| 252402 ||  || — || October 13, 2001 || Socorro || LINEAR || — || align=right | 2.8 km || 
|-id=403 bgcolor=#E9E9E9
| 252403 ||  || — || October 13, 2001 || Socorro || LINEAR || — || align=right | 3.1 km || 
|-id=404 bgcolor=#E9E9E9
| 252404 ||  || — || October 13, 2001 || Socorro || LINEAR || MIS || align=right | 3.6 km || 
|-id=405 bgcolor=#E9E9E9
| 252405 ||  || — || October 14, 2001 || Socorro || LINEAR || — || align=right | 2.3 km || 
|-id=406 bgcolor=#E9E9E9
| 252406 ||  || — || October 14, 2001 || Socorro || LINEAR || — || align=right | 3.1 km || 
|-id=407 bgcolor=#E9E9E9
| 252407 ||  || — || October 14, 2001 || Socorro || LINEAR || — || align=right | 2.1 km || 
|-id=408 bgcolor=#E9E9E9
| 252408 ||  || — || October 14, 2001 || Socorro || LINEAR || — || align=right | 2.1 km || 
|-id=409 bgcolor=#E9E9E9
| 252409 ||  || — || October 14, 2001 || Socorro || LINEAR || MAR || align=right | 1.8 km || 
|-id=410 bgcolor=#E9E9E9
| 252410 ||  || — || October 14, 2001 || Socorro || LINEAR || — || align=right | 3.6 km || 
|-id=411 bgcolor=#E9E9E9
| 252411 ||  || — || October 13, 2001 || Socorro || LINEAR || — || align=right | 4.2 km || 
|-id=412 bgcolor=#E9E9E9
| 252412 ||  || — || October 14, 2001 || Socorro || LINEAR || — || align=right | 3.1 km || 
|-id=413 bgcolor=#E9E9E9
| 252413 ||  || — || October 14, 2001 || Socorro || LINEAR || — || align=right | 2.6 km || 
|-id=414 bgcolor=#E9E9E9
| 252414 ||  || — || October 14, 2001 || Socorro || LINEAR || — || align=right | 2.8 km || 
|-id=415 bgcolor=#E9E9E9
| 252415 ||  || — || October 14, 2001 || Socorro || LINEAR || INO || align=right | 3.5 km || 
|-id=416 bgcolor=#E9E9E9
| 252416 ||  || — || October 14, 2001 || Socorro || LINEAR || — || align=right | 3.0 km || 
|-id=417 bgcolor=#E9E9E9
| 252417 ||  || — || October 15, 2001 || Socorro || LINEAR || — || align=right | 4.0 km || 
|-id=418 bgcolor=#E9E9E9
| 252418 ||  || — || October 15, 2001 || Socorro || LINEAR || — || align=right | 2.6 km || 
|-id=419 bgcolor=#E9E9E9
| 252419 ||  || — || October 15, 2001 || Socorro || LINEAR || — || align=right | 4.4 km || 
|-id=420 bgcolor=#E9E9E9
| 252420 ||  || — || October 15, 2001 || Socorro || LINEAR || — || align=right | 2.8 km || 
|-id=421 bgcolor=#E9E9E9
| 252421 ||  || — || October 12, 2001 || Anderson Mesa || LONEOS || — || align=right | 2.3 km || 
|-id=422 bgcolor=#E9E9E9
| 252422 ||  || — || October 12, 2001 || Haleakala || NEAT || — || align=right | 2.4 km || 
|-id=423 bgcolor=#E9E9E9
| 252423 ||  || — || October 12, 2001 || Haleakala || NEAT || — || align=right | 3.1 km || 
|-id=424 bgcolor=#E9E9E9
| 252424 ||  || — || October 12, 2001 || Haleakala || NEAT || — || align=right | 2.7 km || 
|-id=425 bgcolor=#E9E9E9
| 252425 ||  || — || October 13, 2001 || Palomar || NEAT || — || align=right | 2.5 km || 
|-id=426 bgcolor=#E9E9E9
| 252426 ||  || — || October 13, 2001 || Palomar || NEAT || — || align=right | 3.7 km || 
|-id=427 bgcolor=#E9E9E9
| 252427 ||  || — || October 14, 2001 || Palomar || NEAT || — || align=right | 2.7 km || 
|-id=428 bgcolor=#E9E9E9
| 252428 ||  || — || October 10, 2001 || Palomar || NEAT || HNS || align=right | 1.8 km || 
|-id=429 bgcolor=#E9E9E9
| 252429 ||  || — || October 10, 2001 || Palomar || NEAT || MAR || align=right | 1.5 km || 
|-id=430 bgcolor=#E9E9E9
| 252430 ||  || — || October 10, 2001 || Palomar || NEAT || — || align=right | 2.0 km || 
|-id=431 bgcolor=#E9E9E9
| 252431 ||  || — || October 10, 2001 || Palomar || NEAT || — || align=right | 3.5 km || 
|-id=432 bgcolor=#E9E9E9
| 252432 ||  || — || October 10, 2001 || Palomar || NEAT || — || align=right | 2.4 km || 
|-id=433 bgcolor=#E9E9E9
| 252433 ||  || — || October 10, 2001 || Palomar || NEAT || — || align=right | 3.4 km || 
|-id=434 bgcolor=#E9E9E9
| 252434 ||  || — || October 10, 2001 || Palomar || NEAT || — || align=right | 1.8 km || 
|-id=435 bgcolor=#E9E9E9
| 252435 ||  || — || October 14, 2001 || Kitt Peak || Spacewatch || — || align=right | 1.9 km || 
|-id=436 bgcolor=#E9E9E9
| 252436 ||  || — || October 11, 2001 || Palomar || NEAT || — || align=right | 1.9 km || 
|-id=437 bgcolor=#E9E9E9
| 252437 ||  || — || October 11, 2001 || Palomar || NEAT || GEF || align=right | 2.3 km || 
|-id=438 bgcolor=#E9E9E9
| 252438 ||  || — || October 15, 2001 || Socorro || LINEAR || — || align=right | 3.9 km || 
|-id=439 bgcolor=#E9E9E9
| 252439 ||  || — || October 15, 2001 || Socorro || LINEAR || CLO || align=right | 3.2 km || 
|-id=440 bgcolor=#E9E9E9
| 252440 ||  || — || October 13, 2001 || Anderson Mesa || LONEOS || — || align=right | 2.5 km || 
|-id=441 bgcolor=#E9E9E9
| 252441 ||  || — || October 14, 2001 || Socorro || LINEAR || PAD || align=right | 2.2 km || 
|-id=442 bgcolor=#E9E9E9
| 252442 ||  || — || October 14, 2001 || Socorro || LINEAR || — || align=right | 4.4 km || 
|-id=443 bgcolor=#E9E9E9
| 252443 ||  || — || October 14, 2001 || Socorro || LINEAR || INO || align=right | 1.8 km || 
|-id=444 bgcolor=#E9E9E9
| 252444 ||  || — || October 14, 2001 || Socorro || LINEAR || GEF || align=right | 2.0 km || 
|-id=445 bgcolor=#E9E9E9
| 252445 ||  || — || October 15, 2001 || Socorro || LINEAR || — || align=right | 2.0 km || 
|-id=446 bgcolor=#E9E9E9
| 252446 ||  || — || October 15, 2001 || Kitt Peak || Spacewatch || — || align=right | 2.5 km || 
|-id=447 bgcolor=#E9E9E9
| 252447 ||  || — || October 15, 2001 || Palomar || NEAT || DOR || align=right | 3.3 km || 
|-id=448 bgcolor=#E9E9E9
| 252448 ||  || — || October 11, 2001 || Socorro || LINEAR || — || align=right | 3.6 km || 
|-id=449 bgcolor=#E9E9E9
| 252449 ||  || — || October 11, 2001 || Socorro || LINEAR || — || align=right | 3.0 km || 
|-id=450 bgcolor=#E9E9E9
| 252450 ||  || — || October 11, 2001 || Socorro || LINEAR || INO || align=right | 1.7 km || 
|-id=451 bgcolor=#E9E9E9
| 252451 ||  || — || October 11, 2001 || Palomar || NEAT || — || align=right | 2.2 km || 
|-id=452 bgcolor=#E9E9E9
| 252452 ||  || — || October 13, 2001 || Palomar || NEAT || ADE || align=right | 3.1 km || 
|-id=453 bgcolor=#E9E9E9
| 252453 ||  || — || October 13, 2001 || Socorro || LINEAR || — || align=right | 1.9 km || 
|-id=454 bgcolor=#E9E9E9
| 252454 ||  || — || October 13, 2001 || Anderson Mesa || LONEOS || — || align=right | 2.4 km || 
|-id=455 bgcolor=#E9E9E9
| 252455 ||  || — || October 13, 2001 || Palomar || NEAT || — || align=right | 2.7 km || 
|-id=456 bgcolor=#E9E9E9
| 252456 ||  || — || October 14, 2001 || Socorro || LINEAR || — || align=right | 2.1 km || 
|-id=457 bgcolor=#E9E9E9
| 252457 ||  || — || October 14, 2001 || Socorro || LINEAR || — || align=right | 3.0 km || 
|-id=458 bgcolor=#E9E9E9
| 252458 ||  || — || October 15, 2001 || Socorro || LINEAR || — || align=right | 3.1 km || 
|-id=459 bgcolor=#E9E9E9
| 252459 ||  || — || October 15, 2001 || Socorro || LINEAR || — || align=right | 2.7 km || 
|-id=460 bgcolor=#E9E9E9
| 252460 ||  || — || October 15, 2001 || Kitt Peak || Spacewatch || NEM || align=right | 2.7 km || 
|-id=461 bgcolor=#E9E9E9
| 252461 ||  || — || October 15, 2001 || Palomar || NEAT || slow || align=right | 3.1 km || 
|-id=462 bgcolor=#E9E9E9
| 252462 ||  || — || October 15, 2001 || Palomar || NEAT || — || align=right | 3.8 km || 
|-id=463 bgcolor=#E9E9E9
| 252463 ||  || — || October 15, 2001 || Palomar || NEAT || — || align=right | 2.8 km || 
|-id=464 bgcolor=#d6d6d6
| 252464 ||  || — || October 11, 2001 || Kitt Peak || Spacewatch || — || align=right | 3.0 km || 
|-id=465 bgcolor=#E9E9E9
| 252465 ||  || — || October 14, 2001 || Apache Point || SDSS || — || align=right | 1.6 km || 
|-id=466 bgcolor=#d6d6d6
| 252466 ||  || — || October 14, 2001 || Apache Point || SDSS || 3:2 || align=right | 6.0 km || 
|-id=467 bgcolor=#E9E9E9
| 252467 ||  || — || October 10, 2001 || Palomar || NEAT || — || align=right | 2.2 km || 
|-id=468 bgcolor=#E9E9E9
| 252468 ||  || — || October 16, 2001 || Socorro || LINEAR || — || align=right | 3.2 km || 
|-id=469 bgcolor=#E9E9E9
| 252469 ||  || — || October 21, 2001 || Desert Eagle || W. K. Y. Yeung || — || align=right | 4.5 km || 
|-id=470 bgcolor=#E9E9E9
| 252470 Puigmarti ||  ||  || October 24, 2001 || Begues || J. Manteca || ADE || align=right | 5.0 km || 
|-id=471 bgcolor=#E9E9E9
| 252471 ||  || — || October 25, 2001 || Desert Eagle || W. K. Y. Yeung || — || align=right | 2.5 km || 
|-id=472 bgcolor=#E9E9E9
| 252472 ||  || — || October 16, 2001 || Palomar || NEAT || MIS || align=right | 2.5 km || 
|-id=473 bgcolor=#E9E9E9
| 252473 ||  || — || October 17, 2001 || Socorro || LINEAR || EUN || align=right | 2.3 km || 
|-id=474 bgcolor=#E9E9E9
| 252474 ||  || — || October 18, 2001 || Socorro || LINEAR || — || align=right | 2.5 km || 
|-id=475 bgcolor=#E9E9E9
| 252475 ||  || — || October 18, 2001 || Socorro || LINEAR || DOR || align=right | 3.0 km || 
|-id=476 bgcolor=#E9E9E9
| 252476 ||  || — || October 17, 2001 || Socorro || LINEAR || AGN || align=right | 1.3 km || 
|-id=477 bgcolor=#E9E9E9
| 252477 ||  || — || October 17, 2001 || Socorro || LINEAR || — || align=right | 3.0 km || 
|-id=478 bgcolor=#E9E9E9
| 252478 ||  || — || October 17, 2001 || Socorro || LINEAR || MRX || align=right | 1.8 km || 
|-id=479 bgcolor=#E9E9E9
| 252479 ||  || — || October 17, 2001 || Socorro || LINEAR || ADE || align=right | 2.9 km || 
|-id=480 bgcolor=#E9E9E9
| 252480 ||  || — || October 17, 2001 || Socorro || LINEAR || — || align=right | 2.4 km || 
|-id=481 bgcolor=#E9E9E9
| 252481 ||  || — || October 17, 2001 || Socorro || LINEAR || — || align=right | 1.9 km || 
|-id=482 bgcolor=#E9E9E9
| 252482 ||  || — || October 20, 2001 || Socorro || LINEAR || — || align=right | 2.9 km || 
|-id=483 bgcolor=#E9E9E9
| 252483 ||  || — || October 20, 2001 || Socorro || LINEAR || ADE || align=right | 3.7 km || 
|-id=484 bgcolor=#E9E9E9
| 252484 ||  || — || October 17, 2001 || Socorro || LINEAR || — || align=right | 3.2 km || 
|-id=485 bgcolor=#E9E9E9
| 252485 ||  || — || October 17, 2001 || Socorro || LINEAR || — || align=right | 2.7 km || 
|-id=486 bgcolor=#E9E9E9
| 252486 ||  || — || October 17, 2001 || Socorro || LINEAR || — || align=right | 1.8 km || 
|-id=487 bgcolor=#E9E9E9
| 252487 ||  || — || October 17, 2001 || Socorro || LINEAR || INO || align=right | 2.0 km || 
|-id=488 bgcolor=#E9E9E9
| 252488 ||  || — || October 20, 2001 || Socorro || LINEAR || — || align=right | 3.1 km || 
|-id=489 bgcolor=#E9E9E9
| 252489 ||  || — || October 21, 2001 || Socorro || LINEAR || GEF || align=right | 2.0 km || 
|-id=490 bgcolor=#E9E9E9
| 252490 ||  || — || October 18, 2001 || Kitt Peak || Spacewatch || GEF || align=right | 3.0 km || 
|-id=491 bgcolor=#E9E9E9
| 252491 ||  || — || October 19, 2001 || Haleakala || NEAT || — || align=right | 3.6 km || 
|-id=492 bgcolor=#E9E9E9
| 252492 ||  || — || October 17, 2001 || Socorro || LINEAR || — || align=right | 2.8 km || 
|-id=493 bgcolor=#E9E9E9
| 252493 ||  || — || October 17, 2001 || Socorro || LINEAR || — || align=right | 2.0 km || 
|-id=494 bgcolor=#E9E9E9
| 252494 ||  || — || October 20, 2001 || Socorro || LINEAR || — || align=right | 2.7 km || 
|-id=495 bgcolor=#E9E9E9
| 252495 ||  || — || October 20, 2001 || Socorro || LINEAR || — || align=right | 3.1 km || 
|-id=496 bgcolor=#E9E9E9
| 252496 ||  || — || October 20, 2001 || Socorro || LINEAR || MRX || align=right | 1.8 km || 
|-id=497 bgcolor=#E9E9E9
| 252497 ||  || — || October 21, 2001 || Socorro || LINEAR || — || align=right | 3.9 km || 
|-id=498 bgcolor=#E9E9E9
| 252498 ||  || — || October 22, 2001 || Socorro || LINEAR || — || align=right | 3.4 km || 
|-id=499 bgcolor=#E9E9E9
| 252499 ||  || — || October 22, 2001 || Palomar || NEAT || — || align=right | 2.9 km || 
|-id=500 bgcolor=#d6d6d6
| 252500 ||  || — || October 20, 2001 || Socorro || LINEAR || EOS || align=right | 2.8 km || 
|}

252501–252600 

|-bgcolor=#E9E9E9
| 252501 ||  || — || October 20, 2001 || Socorro || LINEAR || WIT || align=right | 1.5 km || 
|-id=502 bgcolor=#E9E9E9
| 252502 ||  || — || October 20, 2001 || Socorro || LINEAR || NEM || align=right | 2.5 km || 
|-id=503 bgcolor=#E9E9E9
| 252503 ||  || — || October 21, 2001 || Socorro || LINEAR || — || align=right | 2.9 km || 
|-id=504 bgcolor=#E9E9E9
| 252504 ||  || — || October 22, 2001 || Socorro || LINEAR || — || align=right | 2.4 km || 
|-id=505 bgcolor=#E9E9E9
| 252505 ||  || — || October 23, 2001 || Socorro || LINEAR || INO || align=right | 1.9 km || 
|-id=506 bgcolor=#E9E9E9
| 252506 ||  || — || October 23, 2001 || Socorro || LINEAR || — || align=right | 2.9 km || 
|-id=507 bgcolor=#E9E9E9
| 252507 ||  || — || October 23, 2001 || Socorro || LINEAR || GEF || align=right | 2.0 km || 
|-id=508 bgcolor=#E9E9E9
| 252508 ||  || — || October 21, 2001 || Socorro || LINEAR || — || align=right | 2.7 km || 
|-id=509 bgcolor=#E9E9E9
| 252509 ||  || — || October 18, 2001 || Palomar || NEAT || NEM || align=right | 3.1 km || 
|-id=510 bgcolor=#E9E9E9
| 252510 ||  || — || October 24, 2001 || Palomar || NEAT || — || align=right | 3.1 km || 
|-id=511 bgcolor=#E9E9E9
| 252511 ||  || — || October 26, 2001 || Haleakala || NEAT || JUN || align=right | 3.5 km || 
|-id=512 bgcolor=#E9E9E9
| 252512 ||  || — || October 16, 2001 || Palomar || NEAT || — || align=right | 3.4 km || 
|-id=513 bgcolor=#E9E9E9
| 252513 ||  || — || October 16, 2001 || Palomar || NEAT || — || align=right | 2.8 km || 
|-id=514 bgcolor=#E9E9E9
| 252514 ||  || — || October 17, 2001 || Palomar || NEAT || — || align=right | 3.8 km || 
|-id=515 bgcolor=#E9E9E9
| 252515 ||  || — || October 17, 2001 || Palomar || NEAT || — || align=right | 2.7 km || 
|-id=516 bgcolor=#E9E9E9
| 252516 ||  || — || October 18, 2001 || Palomar || NEAT || AEO || align=right | 1.2 km || 
|-id=517 bgcolor=#E9E9E9
| 252517 ||  || — || October 19, 2001 || Palomar || NEAT || WIT || align=right | 1.2 km || 
|-id=518 bgcolor=#E9E9E9
| 252518 ||  || — || October 19, 2001 || Palomar || NEAT || — || align=right | 2.5 km || 
|-id=519 bgcolor=#E9E9E9
| 252519 ||  || — || October 19, 2001 || Palomar || NEAT || — || align=right | 2.4 km || 
|-id=520 bgcolor=#E9E9E9
| 252520 ||  || — || October 19, 2001 || Kitt Peak || Spacewatch || — || align=right | 3.6 km || 
|-id=521 bgcolor=#E9E9E9
| 252521 ||  || — || October 19, 2001 || Kitt Peak || Spacewatch || — || align=right | 2.2 km || 
|-id=522 bgcolor=#E9E9E9
| 252522 ||  || — || October 19, 2001 || Palomar || NEAT || — || align=right | 2.9 km || 
|-id=523 bgcolor=#E9E9E9
| 252523 ||  || — || October 21, 2001 || Socorro || LINEAR || — || align=right | 2.4 km || 
|-id=524 bgcolor=#E9E9E9
| 252524 ||  || — || October 24, 2001 || Socorro || LINEAR || XIZ || align=right | 1.9 km || 
|-id=525 bgcolor=#E9E9E9
| 252525 ||  || — || October 18, 2001 || Socorro || LINEAR || — || align=right | 3.0 km || 
|-id=526 bgcolor=#E9E9E9
| 252526 ||  || — || October 21, 2001 || Socorro || LINEAR || — || align=right | 2.7 km || 
|-id=527 bgcolor=#E9E9E9
| 252527 ||  || — || October 21, 2001 || Socorro || LINEAR || — || align=right | 3.2 km || 
|-id=528 bgcolor=#E9E9E9
| 252528 ||  || — || October 16, 2001 || Palomar || NEAT || — || align=right | 2.7 km || 
|-id=529 bgcolor=#E9E9E9
| 252529 ||  || — || November 9, 2001 || Socorro || LINEAR || — || align=right | 2.7 km || 
|-id=530 bgcolor=#E9E9E9
| 252530 ||  || — || November 10, 2001 || Socorro || LINEAR || — || align=right | 3.3 km || 
|-id=531 bgcolor=#E9E9E9
| 252531 ||  || — || November 10, 2001 || Socorro || LINEAR || — || align=right | 3.1 km || 
|-id=532 bgcolor=#E9E9E9
| 252532 ||  || — || November 11, 2001 || Socorro || LINEAR || — || align=right | 2.4 km || 
|-id=533 bgcolor=#E9E9E9
| 252533 ||  || — || November 9, 2001 || Socorro || LINEAR || — || align=right | 3.2 km || 
|-id=534 bgcolor=#E9E9E9
| 252534 ||  || — || November 9, 2001 || Socorro || LINEAR || — || align=right | 2.2 km || 
|-id=535 bgcolor=#E9E9E9
| 252535 ||  || — || November 9, 2001 || Socorro || LINEAR || — || align=right | 1.8 km || 
|-id=536 bgcolor=#E9E9E9
| 252536 ||  || — || November 10, 2001 || Socorro || LINEAR || GEF || align=right | 1.7 km || 
|-id=537 bgcolor=#E9E9E9
| 252537 ||  || — || November 10, 2001 || Socorro || LINEAR || — || align=right | 3.9 km || 
|-id=538 bgcolor=#E9E9E9
| 252538 ||  || — || November 10, 2001 || Socorro || LINEAR || — || align=right | 3.4 km || 
|-id=539 bgcolor=#E9E9E9
| 252539 ||  || — || November 10, 2001 || Socorro || LINEAR || — || align=right | 2.7 km || 
|-id=540 bgcolor=#E9E9E9
| 252540 ||  || — || November 10, 2001 || Socorro || LINEAR || WIT || align=right | 1.5 km || 
|-id=541 bgcolor=#E9E9E9
| 252541 ||  || — || November 10, 2001 || Socorro || LINEAR || — || align=right | 1.7 km || 
|-id=542 bgcolor=#E9E9E9
| 252542 ||  || — || November 10, 2001 || Socorro || LINEAR || — || align=right | 3.1 km || 
|-id=543 bgcolor=#E9E9E9
| 252543 ||  || — || November 10, 2001 || Socorro || LINEAR || — || align=right | 3.0 km || 
|-id=544 bgcolor=#E9E9E9
| 252544 ||  || — || November 10, 2001 || Socorro || LINEAR || MRX || align=right | 1.7 km || 
|-id=545 bgcolor=#E9E9E9
| 252545 ||  || — || November 10, 2001 || Socorro || LINEAR || — || align=right | 3.2 km || 
|-id=546 bgcolor=#E9E9E9
| 252546 ||  || — || November 10, 2001 || Socorro || LINEAR || — || align=right | 3.7 km || 
|-id=547 bgcolor=#E9E9E9
| 252547 ||  || — || November 11, 2001 || Socorro || LINEAR || — || align=right | 3.1 km || 
|-id=548 bgcolor=#E9E9E9
| 252548 ||  || — || November 8, 2001 || Palomar || NEAT || — || align=right | 1.7 km || 
|-id=549 bgcolor=#E9E9E9
| 252549 ||  || — || November 15, 2001 || Kitt Peak || Spacewatch || — || align=right | 4.0 km || 
|-id=550 bgcolor=#E9E9E9
| 252550 ||  || — || November 10, 2001 || Palomar || NEAT || EUN || align=right | 2.0 km || 
|-id=551 bgcolor=#E9E9E9
| 252551 ||  || — || November 10, 2001 || Socorro || LINEAR || — || align=right | 2.1 km || 
|-id=552 bgcolor=#E9E9E9
| 252552 ||  || — || November 12, 2001 || Socorro || LINEAR || — || align=right | 2.8 km || 
|-id=553 bgcolor=#E9E9E9
| 252553 ||  || — || November 15, 2001 || Socorro || LINEAR || — || align=right | 3.6 km || 
|-id=554 bgcolor=#E9E9E9
| 252554 ||  || — || November 12, 2001 || Socorro || LINEAR || — || align=right | 2.8 km || 
|-id=555 bgcolor=#E9E9E9
| 252555 ||  || — || November 12, 2001 || Socorro || LINEAR || — || align=right | 2.4 km || 
|-id=556 bgcolor=#E9E9E9
| 252556 ||  || — || November 12, 2001 || Socorro || LINEAR || — || align=right | 3.8 km || 
|-id=557 bgcolor=#E9E9E9
| 252557 ||  || — || November 12, 2001 || Socorro || LINEAR || — || align=right | 3.0 km || 
|-id=558 bgcolor=#FFC2E0
| 252558 ||  || — || November 17, 2001 || Socorro || LINEAR || APO || align=right data-sort-value="0.53" | 530 m || 
|-id=559 bgcolor=#E9E9E9
| 252559 ||  || — || November 17, 2001 || Socorro || LINEAR || — || align=right | 2.2 km || 
|-id=560 bgcolor=#d6d6d6
| 252560 ||  || — || November 17, 2001 || Socorro || LINEAR || — || align=right | 3.0 km || 
|-id=561 bgcolor=#E9E9E9
| 252561 ||  || — || November 17, 2001 || Socorro || LINEAR || — || align=right | 2.3 km || 
|-id=562 bgcolor=#E9E9E9
| 252562 ||  || — || November 17, 2001 || Socorro || LINEAR || — || align=right | 3.8 km || 
|-id=563 bgcolor=#E9E9E9
| 252563 ||  || — || November 18, 2001 || Socorro || LINEAR || MAR || align=right | 1.7 km || 
|-id=564 bgcolor=#E9E9E9
| 252564 ||  || — || November 18, 2001 || Socorro || LINEAR || — || align=right | 2.9 km || 
|-id=565 bgcolor=#E9E9E9
| 252565 ||  || — || November 27, 2001 || Socorro || LINEAR || PAL || align=right | 3.0 km || 
|-id=566 bgcolor=#E9E9E9
| 252566 ||  || — || November 17, 2001 || Socorro || LINEAR || AST || align=right | 2.9 km || 
|-id=567 bgcolor=#E9E9E9
| 252567 ||  || — || November 18, 2001 || Socorro || LINEAR || — || align=right | 4.9 km || 
|-id=568 bgcolor=#E9E9E9
| 252568 ||  || — || November 18, 2001 || Socorro || LINEAR || WIT || align=right | 1.4 km || 
|-id=569 bgcolor=#E9E9E9
| 252569 ||  || — || November 17, 2001 || Socorro || LINEAR || NEM || align=right | 3.0 km || 
|-id=570 bgcolor=#E9E9E9
| 252570 ||  || — || November 17, 2001 || Socorro || LINEAR || AST || align=right | 2.2 km || 
|-id=571 bgcolor=#E9E9E9
| 252571 ||  || — || November 19, 2001 || Socorro || LINEAR || — || align=right | 2.9 km || 
|-id=572 bgcolor=#E9E9E9
| 252572 ||  || — || November 19, 2001 || Socorro || LINEAR || MRX || align=right | 1.4 km || 
|-id=573 bgcolor=#E9E9E9
| 252573 ||  || — || November 19, 2001 || Socorro || LINEAR || — || align=right | 3.4 km || 
|-id=574 bgcolor=#E9E9E9
| 252574 ||  || — || November 19, 2001 || Socorro || LINEAR || — || align=right | 2.8 km || 
|-id=575 bgcolor=#E9E9E9
| 252575 ||  || — || November 20, 2001 || Socorro || LINEAR || — || align=right | 2.1 km || 
|-id=576 bgcolor=#E9E9E9
| 252576 ||  || — || November 20, 2001 || Socorro || LINEAR || — || align=right | 1.8 km || 
|-id=577 bgcolor=#E9E9E9
| 252577 ||  || — || November 20, 2001 || Socorro || LINEAR || — || align=right | 2.7 km || 
|-id=578 bgcolor=#E9E9E9
| 252578 ||  || — || November 20, 2001 || Socorro || LINEAR || — || align=right | 3.4 km || 
|-id=579 bgcolor=#E9E9E9
| 252579 ||  || — || November 20, 2001 || Socorro || LINEAR || — || align=right | 3.6 km || 
|-id=580 bgcolor=#E9E9E9
| 252580 ||  || — || November 20, 2001 || Socorro || LINEAR || WIT || align=right | 1.4 km || 
|-id=581 bgcolor=#E9E9E9
| 252581 ||  || — || November 20, 2001 || Socorro || LINEAR || HOF || align=right | 3.1 km || 
|-id=582 bgcolor=#E9E9E9
| 252582 ||  || — || November 19, 2001 || Socorro || LINEAR || — || align=right | 3.4 km || 
|-id=583 bgcolor=#E9E9E9
| 252583 ||  || — || November 21, 2001 || Socorro || LINEAR || MRX || align=right | 1.3 km || 
|-id=584 bgcolor=#E9E9E9
| 252584 ||  || — || November 19, 2001 || Anderson Mesa || LONEOS || PAD || align=right | 2.3 km || 
|-id=585 bgcolor=#E9E9E9
| 252585 ||  || — || November 21, 2001 || Socorro || LINEAR || WIT || align=right | 1.4 km || 
|-id=586 bgcolor=#E9E9E9
| 252586 ||  || — || November 24, 2001 || Socorro || LINEAR || — || align=right | 3.2 km || 
|-id=587 bgcolor=#E9E9E9
| 252587 ||  || — || November 17, 2001 || Socorro || LINEAR || — || align=right | 3.2 km || 
|-id=588 bgcolor=#E9E9E9
| 252588 ||  || — || November 17, 2001 || Anderson Mesa || LONEOS || — || align=right | 3.3 km || 
|-id=589 bgcolor=#E9E9E9
| 252589 ||  || — || November 20, 2001 || Socorro || LINEAR || — || align=right | 2.6 km || 
|-id=590 bgcolor=#E9E9E9
| 252590 ||  || — || November 21, 2001 || Apache Point || SDSS || — || align=right | 3.5 km || 
|-id=591 bgcolor=#E9E9E9
| 252591 ||  || — || December 9, 2001 || Badlands || Badlands Obs. || — || align=right | 4.0 km || 
|-id=592 bgcolor=#E9E9E9
| 252592 ||  || — || December 8, 2001 || Socorro || LINEAR || — || align=right | 3.8 km || 
|-id=593 bgcolor=#E9E9E9
| 252593 ||  || — || December 9, 2001 || Socorro || LINEAR || — || align=right | 4.9 km || 
|-id=594 bgcolor=#E9E9E9
| 252594 ||  || — || December 9, 2001 || Socorro || LINEAR || JUN || align=right | 1.6 km || 
|-id=595 bgcolor=#E9E9E9
| 252595 ||  || — || December 9, 2001 || Socorro || LINEAR || — || align=right | 3.2 km || 
|-id=596 bgcolor=#E9E9E9
| 252596 ||  || — || December 9, 2001 || Socorro || LINEAR || — || align=right | 2.8 km || 
|-id=597 bgcolor=#E9E9E9
| 252597 ||  || — || December 10, 2001 || Socorro || LINEAR || — || align=right | 3.9 km || 
|-id=598 bgcolor=#E9E9E9
| 252598 ||  || — || December 11, 2001 || Socorro || LINEAR || — || align=right | 5.8 km || 
|-id=599 bgcolor=#E9E9E9
| 252599 ||  || — || December 9, 2001 || Socorro || LINEAR || — || align=right | 3.7 km || 
|-id=600 bgcolor=#E9E9E9
| 252600 ||  || — || December 9, 2001 || Socorro || LINEAR || — || align=right | 3.4 km || 
|}

252601–252700 

|-bgcolor=#E9E9E9
| 252601 ||  || — || December 9, 2001 || Socorro || LINEAR || — || align=right | 2.4 km || 
|-id=602 bgcolor=#E9E9E9
| 252602 ||  || — || December 9, 2001 || Socorro || LINEAR || GEF || align=right | 6.0 km || 
|-id=603 bgcolor=#E9E9E9
| 252603 ||  || — || December 10, 2001 || Socorro || LINEAR || — || align=right | 3.1 km || 
|-id=604 bgcolor=#E9E9E9
| 252604 ||  || — || December 10, 2001 || Socorro || LINEAR || — || align=right | 4.2 km || 
|-id=605 bgcolor=#E9E9E9
| 252605 ||  || — || December 10, 2001 || Socorro || LINEAR || — || align=right | 2.3 km || 
|-id=606 bgcolor=#E9E9E9
| 252606 ||  || — || December 11, 2001 || Socorro || LINEAR || — || align=right | 3.7 km || 
|-id=607 bgcolor=#E9E9E9
| 252607 ||  || — || December 11, 2001 || Socorro || LINEAR || — || align=right | 3.5 km || 
|-id=608 bgcolor=#E9E9E9
| 252608 ||  || — || December 11, 2001 || Socorro || LINEAR || — || align=right | 2.9 km || 
|-id=609 bgcolor=#E9E9E9
| 252609 ||  || — || December 11, 2001 || Socorro || LINEAR || — || align=right | 2.1 km || 
|-id=610 bgcolor=#E9E9E9
| 252610 ||  || — || December 10, 2001 || Socorro || LINEAR || MAR || align=right | 1.9 km || 
|-id=611 bgcolor=#d6d6d6
| 252611 ||  || — || December 10, 2001 || Socorro || LINEAR || — || align=right | 3.7 km || 
|-id=612 bgcolor=#E9E9E9
| 252612 ||  || — || December 10, 2001 || Socorro || LINEAR || — || align=right | 4.1 km || 
|-id=613 bgcolor=#E9E9E9
| 252613 ||  || — || December 10, 2001 || Socorro || LINEAR || — || align=right | 2.9 km || 
|-id=614 bgcolor=#E9E9E9
| 252614 ||  || — || December 10, 2001 || Socorro || LINEAR || NEM || align=right | 2.1 km || 
|-id=615 bgcolor=#E9E9E9
| 252615 ||  || — || December 10, 2001 || Socorro || LINEAR || GEF || align=right | 2.2 km || 
|-id=616 bgcolor=#E9E9E9
| 252616 ||  || — || December 11, 2001 || Socorro || LINEAR || WIT || align=right | 1.5 km || 
|-id=617 bgcolor=#E9E9E9
| 252617 ||  || — || December 13, 2001 || Socorro || LINEAR || GEF || align=right | 2.4 km || 
|-id=618 bgcolor=#E9E9E9
| 252618 ||  || — || December 13, 2001 || Socorro || LINEAR || INO || align=right | 2.1 km || 
|-id=619 bgcolor=#E9E9E9
| 252619 ||  || — || December 14, 2001 || Socorro || LINEAR || — || align=right | 3.7 km || 
|-id=620 bgcolor=#E9E9E9
| 252620 ||  || — || December 14, 2001 || Socorro || LINEAR || AGN || align=right | 1.4 km || 
|-id=621 bgcolor=#E9E9E9
| 252621 ||  || — || December 14, 2001 || Socorro || LINEAR || — || align=right | 3.0 km || 
|-id=622 bgcolor=#d6d6d6
| 252622 ||  || — || December 14, 2001 || Socorro || LINEAR || 615 || align=right | 1.7 km || 
|-id=623 bgcolor=#E9E9E9
| 252623 ||  || — || December 14, 2001 || Socorro || LINEAR || — || align=right | 3.7 km || 
|-id=624 bgcolor=#E9E9E9
| 252624 ||  || — || December 14, 2001 || Socorro || LINEAR || — || align=right | 3.8 km || 
|-id=625 bgcolor=#E9E9E9
| 252625 ||  || — || December 14, 2001 || Socorro || LINEAR || — || align=right | 3.8 km || 
|-id=626 bgcolor=#E9E9E9
| 252626 ||  || — || December 14, 2001 || Socorro || LINEAR || MRX || align=right | 1.5 km || 
|-id=627 bgcolor=#E9E9E9
| 252627 ||  || — || December 14, 2001 || Socorro || LINEAR || MRX || align=right | 1.6 km || 
|-id=628 bgcolor=#E9E9E9
| 252628 ||  || — || December 14, 2001 || Socorro || LINEAR || — || align=right | 4.3 km || 
|-id=629 bgcolor=#E9E9E9
| 252629 ||  || — || December 14, 2001 || Socorro || LINEAR || — || align=right | 2.4 km || 
|-id=630 bgcolor=#E9E9E9
| 252630 ||  || — || December 14, 2001 || Socorro || LINEAR || — || align=right | 3.5 km || 
|-id=631 bgcolor=#E9E9E9
| 252631 ||  || — || December 14, 2001 || Socorro || LINEAR || — || align=right | 2.9 km || 
|-id=632 bgcolor=#fefefe
| 252632 ||  || — || December 14, 2001 || Kitt Peak || Spacewatch || — || align=right data-sort-value="0.80" | 800 m || 
|-id=633 bgcolor=#E9E9E9
| 252633 ||  || — || December 11, 2001 || Socorro || LINEAR || — || align=right | 4.2 km || 
|-id=634 bgcolor=#E9E9E9
| 252634 ||  || — || December 11, 2001 || Socorro || LINEAR || — || align=right | 2.7 km || 
|-id=635 bgcolor=#d6d6d6
| 252635 ||  || — || December 15, 2001 || Socorro || LINEAR || EOS || align=right | 3.5 km || 
|-id=636 bgcolor=#E9E9E9
| 252636 ||  || — || December 15, 2001 || Socorro || LINEAR || PAE || align=right | 3.6 km || 
|-id=637 bgcolor=#E9E9E9
| 252637 ||  || — || December 15, 2001 || Socorro || LINEAR || WIT || align=right | 1.7 km || 
|-id=638 bgcolor=#E9E9E9
| 252638 ||  || — || December 15, 2001 || Socorro || LINEAR || — || align=right | 3.0 km || 
|-id=639 bgcolor=#d6d6d6
| 252639 ||  || — || December 15, 2001 || Socorro || LINEAR || — || align=right | 3.7 km || 
|-id=640 bgcolor=#E9E9E9
| 252640 ||  || — || December 15, 2001 || Socorro || LINEAR || WIT || align=right | 1.6 km || 
|-id=641 bgcolor=#d6d6d6
| 252641 ||  || — || December 15, 2001 || Socorro || LINEAR || — || align=right | 2.8 km || 
|-id=642 bgcolor=#E9E9E9
| 252642 ||  || — || December 15, 2001 || Socorro || LINEAR || — || align=right | 3.2 km || 
|-id=643 bgcolor=#E9E9E9
| 252643 ||  || — || December 14, 2001 || Socorro || LINEAR || XIZ || align=right | 2.2 km || 
|-id=644 bgcolor=#E9E9E9
| 252644 ||  || — || December 14, 2001 || Kitt Peak || Spacewatch || PAD || align=right | 3.3 km || 
|-id=645 bgcolor=#E9E9E9
| 252645 ||  || — || December 5, 2001 || Haleakala || NEAT || GEF || align=right | 2.1 km || 
|-id=646 bgcolor=#E9E9E9
| 252646 ||  || — || December 7, 2001 || Socorro || LINEAR || — || align=right | 4.0 km || 
|-id=647 bgcolor=#E9E9E9
| 252647 ||  || — || December 15, 2001 || Apache Point || SDSS || — || align=right | 3.9 km || 
|-id=648 bgcolor=#E9E9E9
| 252648 ||  || — || December 17, 2001 || Socorro || LINEAR || — || align=right | 2.4 km || 
|-id=649 bgcolor=#E9E9E9
| 252649 ||  || — || December 17, 2001 || Socorro || LINEAR || — || align=right | 2.5 km || 
|-id=650 bgcolor=#E9E9E9
| 252650 ||  || — || December 17, 2001 || Socorro || LINEAR || — || align=right | 3.4 km || 
|-id=651 bgcolor=#E9E9E9
| 252651 ||  || — || December 18, 2001 || Socorro || LINEAR || — || align=right | 3.4 km || 
|-id=652 bgcolor=#E9E9E9
| 252652 ||  || — || December 18, 2001 || Socorro || LINEAR || — || align=right | 2.4 km || 
|-id=653 bgcolor=#d6d6d6
| 252653 ||  || — || December 18, 2001 || Socorro || LINEAR || BRA || align=right | 2.6 km || 
|-id=654 bgcolor=#d6d6d6
| 252654 ||  || — || December 18, 2001 || Socorro || LINEAR || BRA || align=right | 1.9 km || 
|-id=655 bgcolor=#E9E9E9
| 252655 ||  || — || December 18, 2001 || Socorro || LINEAR || — || align=right | 2.9 km || 
|-id=656 bgcolor=#E9E9E9
| 252656 ||  || — || December 18, 2001 || Socorro || LINEAR || — || align=right | 3.9 km || 
|-id=657 bgcolor=#E9E9E9
| 252657 ||  || — || December 19, 2001 || Socorro || LINEAR || — || align=right | 3.8 km || 
|-id=658 bgcolor=#E9E9E9
| 252658 ||  || — || December 18, 2001 || Socorro || LINEAR || — || align=right | 4.3 km || 
|-id=659 bgcolor=#E9E9E9
| 252659 ||  || — || December 17, 2001 || Socorro || LINEAR || — || align=right | 3.6 km || 
|-id=660 bgcolor=#E9E9E9
| 252660 ||  || — || December 17, 2001 || Socorro || LINEAR || DOR || align=right | 3.3 km || 
|-id=661 bgcolor=#E9E9E9
| 252661 ||  || — || December 22, 2001 || Socorro || LINEAR || DOR || align=right | 3.0 km || 
|-id=662 bgcolor=#E9E9E9
| 252662 ||  || — || December 17, 2001 || Socorro || LINEAR || — || align=right | 2.5 km || 
|-id=663 bgcolor=#E9E9E9
| 252663 ||  || — || December 19, 2001 || Socorro || LINEAR || — || align=right | 4.2 km || 
|-id=664 bgcolor=#E9E9E9
| 252664 ||  || — || January 5, 2002 || Oizumi || T. Kobayashi || — || align=right | 4.6 km || 
|-id=665 bgcolor=#E9E9E9
| 252665 ||  || — || January 4, 2002 || Cima Ekar || ADAS || — || align=right | 3.2 km || 
|-id=666 bgcolor=#d6d6d6
| 252666 ||  || — || January 9, 2002 || Cima Ekar || ADAS || — || align=right | 5.0 km || 
|-id=667 bgcolor=#d6d6d6
| 252667 ||  || — || January 11, 2002 || Kitt Peak || Spacewatch || — || align=right | 3.9 km || 
|-id=668 bgcolor=#E9E9E9
| 252668 ||  || — || January 8, 2002 || Socorro || LINEAR || — || align=right | 3.4 km || 
|-id=669 bgcolor=#E9E9E9
| 252669 ||  || — || January 9, 2002 || Socorro || LINEAR || GAL || align=right | 2.2 km || 
|-id=670 bgcolor=#E9E9E9
| 252670 ||  || — || January 9, 2002 || Socorro || LINEAR || — || align=right | 3.2 km || 
|-id=671 bgcolor=#fefefe
| 252671 ||  || — || January 9, 2002 || Socorro || LINEAR || — || align=right | 1.2 km || 
|-id=672 bgcolor=#d6d6d6
| 252672 ||  || — || January 9, 2002 || Socorro || LINEAR || — || align=right | 3.0 km || 
|-id=673 bgcolor=#fefefe
| 252673 ||  || — || January 9, 2002 || Socorro || LINEAR || — || align=right | 1.3 km || 
|-id=674 bgcolor=#E9E9E9
| 252674 ||  || — || January 8, 2002 || Socorro || LINEAR || — || align=right | 3.7 km || 
|-id=675 bgcolor=#E9E9E9
| 252675 ||  || — || January 8, 2002 || Socorro || LINEAR || CLO || align=right | 3.4 km || 
|-id=676 bgcolor=#d6d6d6
| 252676 ||  || — || January 9, 2002 || Socorro || LINEAR || — || align=right | 3.6 km || 
|-id=677 bgcolor=#fefefe
| 252677 ||  || — || January 9, 2002 || Socorro || LINEAR || FLO || align=right | 1.2 km || 
|-id=678 bgcolor=#fefefe
| 252678 ||  || — || January 9, 2002 || Socorro || LINEAR || — || align=right | 1.2 km || 
|-id=679 bgcolor=#E9E9E9
| 252679 ||  || — || January 9, 2002 || Socorro || LINEAR || — || align=right | 3.3 km || 
|-id=680 bgcolor=#E9E9E9
| 252680 ||  || — || January 9, 2002 || Socorro || LINEAR || — || align=right | 2.6 km || 
|-id=681 bgcolor=#E9E9E9
| 252681 ||  || — || January 13, 2002 || Socorro || LINEAR || — || align=right | 3.6 km || 
|-id=682 bgcolor=#d6d6d6
| 252682 ||  || — || January 13, 2002 || Socorro || LINEAR || — || align=right | 4.0 km || 
|-id=683 bgcolor=#C2FFFF
| 252683 ||  || — || January 13, 2002 || Socorro || LINEAR || L4ERY || align=right | 12 km || 
|-id=684 bgcolor=#d6d6d6
| 252684 ||  || — || January 14, 2002 || Socorro || LINEAR || FIR || align=right | 4.7 km || 
|-id=685 bgcolor=#d6d6d6
| 252685 ||  || — || January 14, 2002 || Socorro || LINEAR || — || align=right | 4.1 km || 
|-id=686 bgcolor=#d6d6d6
| 252686 ||  || — || January 12, 2002 || Kitt Peak || Spacewatch || KOR || align=right | 2.0 km || 
|-id=687 bgcolor=#E9E9E9
| 252687 ||  || — || January 5, 2002 || Cima Ekar || ADAS || — || align=right | 3.4 km || 
|-id=688 bgcolor=#d6d6d6
| 252688 ||  || — || January 19, 2002 || Socorro || LINEAR || — || align=right | 3.0 km || 
|-id=689 bgcolor=#E9E9E9
| 252689 ||  || — || January 25, 2002 || Socorro || LINEAR || — || align=right | 5.1 km || 
|-id=690 bgcolor=#E9E9E9
| 252690 ||  || — || January 23, 2002 || Socorro || LINEAR || — || align=right | 4.3 km || 
|-id=691 bgcolor=#fefefe
| 252691 ||  || — || January 19, 2002 || Socorro || LINEAR || — || align=right | 1.2 km || 
|-id=692 bgcolor=#d6d6d6
| 252692 ||  || — || January 17, 2002 || Palomar || NEAT || — || align=right | 2.9 km || 
|-id=693 bgcolor=#fefefe
| 252693 ||  || — || February 2, 2002 || Cima Ekar || ADAS || — || align=right | 1.2 km || 
|-id=694 bgcolor=#fefefe
| 252694 ||  || — || February 6, 2002 || Kitt Peak || Spacewatch || — || align=right data-sort-value="0.79" | 790 m || 
|-id=695 bgcolor=#E9E9E9
| 252695 ||  || — || February 6, 2002 || Socorro || LINEAR || — || align=right | 2.4 km || 
|-id=696 bgcolor=#fefefe
| 252696 ||  || — || February 6, 2002 || Socorro || LINEAR || — || align=right | 1.0 km || 
|-id=697 bgcolor=#fefefe
| 252697 ||  || — || February 7, 2002 || Socorro || LINEAR || — || align=right | 1.4 km || 
|-id=698 bgcolor=#C2FFFF
| 252698 ||  || — || February 7, 2002 || Socorro || LINEAR || L4 || align=right | 13 km || 
|-id=699 bgcolor=#fefefe
| 252699 ||  || — || February 7, 2002 || Socorro || LINEAR || — || align=right | 1.5 km || 
|-id=700 bgcolor=#d6d6d6
| 252700 ||  || — || February 7, 2002 || Socorro || LINEAR || — || align=right | 4.3 km || 
|}

252701–252800 

|-bgcolor=#E9E9E9
| 252701 ||  || — || February 7, 2002 || Socorro || LINEAR || — || align=right | 3.5 km || 
|-id=702 bgcolor=#C2FFFF
| 252702 ||  || — || February 7, 2002 || Socorro || LINEAR || L4 || align=right | 14 km || 
|-id=703 bgcolor=#fefefe
| 252703 ||  || — || February 7, 2002 || Socorro || LINEAR || FLO || align=right data-sort-value="0.83" | 830 m || 
|-id=704 bgcolor=#fefefe
| 252704 ||  || — || February 7, 2002 || Socorro || LINEAR || — || align=right | 1.4 km || 
|-id=705 bgcolor=#d6d6d6
| 252705 ||  || — || February 7, 2002 || Socorro || LINEAR || — || align=right | 4.5 km || 
|-id=706 bgcolor=#d6d6d6
| 252706 ||  || — || February 7, 2002 || Socorro || LINEAR || — || align=right | 2.7 km || 
|-id=707 bgcolor=#fefefe
| 252707 ||  || — || February 7, 2002 || Socorro || LINEAR || FLO || align=right data-sort-value="0.84" | 840 m || 
|-id=708 bgcolor=#fefefe
| 252708 ||  || — || February 7, 2002 || Socorro || LINEAR || — || align=right | 1.2 km || 
|-id=709 bgcolor=#fefefe
| 252709 ||  || — || February 7, 2002 || Socorro || LINEAR || — || align=right | 1.3 km || 
|-id=710 bgcolor=#fefefe
| 252710 ||  || — || February 8, 2002 || Socorro || LINEAR || — || align=right | 1.1 km || 
|-id=711 bgcolor=#C2FFFF
| 252711 ||  || — || February 10, 2002 || Socorro || LINEAR || L4ERY || align=right | 12 km || 
|-id=712 bgcolor=#d6d6d6
| 252712 ||  || — || February 8, 2002 || Kitt Peak || Spacewatch || — || align=right | 3.7 km || 
|-id=713 bgcolor=#E9E9E9
| 252713 ||  || — || February 8, 2002 || Socorro || LINEAR || — || align=right | 3.4 km || 
|-id=714 bgcolor=#d6d6d6
| 252714 ||  || — || February 8, 2002 || Socorro || LINEAR || — || align=right | 4.5 km || 
|-id=715 bgcolor=#d6d6d6
| 252715 ||  || — || February 8, 2002 || Socorro || LINEAR || — || align=right | 4.2 km || 
|-id=716 bgcolor=#d6d6d6
| 252716 ||  || — || February 8, 2002 || Socorro || LINEAR || 627 || align=right | 4.2 km || 
|-id=717 bgcolor=#d6d6d6
| 252717 ||  || — || February 10, 2002 || Socorro || LINEAR || KOR || align=right | 1.6 km || 
|-id=718 bgcolor=#d6d6d6
| 252718 ||  || — || February 10, 2002 || Socorro || LINEAR || — || align=right | 2.5 km || 
|-id=719 bgcolor=#fefefe
| 252719 ||  || — || February 10, 2002 || Socorro || LINEAR || — || align=right | 1.1 km || 
|-id=720 bgcolor=#C2FFFF
| 252720 ||  || — || February 10, 2002 || Socorro || LINEAR || L4 || align=right | 13 km || 
|-id=721 bgcolor=#fefefe
| 252721 ||  || — || February 10, 2002 || Socorro || LINEAR || FLO || align=right data-sort-value="0.80" | 800 m || 
|-id=722 bgcolor=#fefefe
| 252722 ||  || — || February 10, 2002 || Socorro || LINEAR || FLO || align=right | 1.1 km || 
|-id=723 bgcolor=#d6d6d6
| 252723 ||  || — || February 5, 2002 || Palomar || NEAT || EOS || align=right | 3.0 km || 
|-id=724 bgcolor=#C2FFFF
| 252724 ||  || — || February 6, 2002 || Palomar || NEAT || L4 || align=right | 16 km || 
|-id=725 bgcolor=#d6d6d6
| 252725 ||  || — || February 12, 2002 || Kitt Peak || Spacewatch || — || align=right | 2.1 km || 
|-id=726 bgcolor=#d6d6d6
| 252726 ||  || — || February 10, 2002 || Socorro || LINEAR || — || align=right | 3.9 km || 
|-id=727 bgcolor=#d6d6d6
| 252727 ||  || — || February 11, 2002 || Socorro || LINEAR || — || align=right | 3.7 km || 
|-id=728 bgcolor=#d6d6d6
| 252728 ||  || — || February 13, 2002 || Kitt Peak || Spacewatch || EOS || align=right | 2.7 km || 
|-id=729 bgcolor=#E9E9E9
| 252729 ||  || — || February 5, 2002 || Anderson Mesa || LONEOS || — || align=right | 3.5 km || 
|-id=730 bgcolor=#d6d6d6
| 252730 ||  || — || February 7, 2002 || Palomar || NEAT || KOR || align=right | 1.9 km || 
|-id=731 bgcolor=#fefefe
| 252731 ||  || — || February 7, 2002 || Kitt Peak || Spacewatch || — || align=right | 1.1 km || 
|-id=732 bgcolor=#d6d6d6
| 252732 ||  || — || February 9, 2002 || Kitt Peak || Spacewatch || — || align=right | 3.7 km || 
|-id=733 bgcolor=#d6d6d6
| 252733 ||  || — || February 7, 2002 || Palomar || NEAT || — || align=right | 3.2 km || 
|-id=734 bgcolor=#fefefe
| 252734 ||  || — || February 10, 2002 || Socorro || LINEAR || — || align=right | 1.0 km || 
|-id=735 bgcolor=#d6d6d6
| 252735 ||  || — || February 8, 2002 || Haleakala || NEAT || — || align=right | 4.5 km || 
|-id=736 bgcolor=#fefefe
| 252736 ||  || — || February 12, 2002 || Socorro || LINEAR || — || align=right data-sort-value="0.96" | 960 m || 
|-id=737 bgcolor=#C2FFFF
| 252737 ||  || — || February 7, 2002 || Socorro || LINEAR || L4 || align=right | 12 km || 
|-id=738 bgcolor=#fefefe
| 252738 ||  || — || February 8, 2002 || Socorro || LINEAR || — || align=right data-sort-value="0.87" | 870 m || 
|-id=739 bgcolor=#d6d6d6
| 252739 ||  || — || February 11, 2002 || Socorro || LINEAR || — || align=right | 3.2 km || 
|-id=740 bgcolor=#C2FFFF
| 252740 ||  || — || February 14, 2002 || Kvistaberg || UDAS || L4 || align=right | 16 km || 
|-id=741 bgcolor=#C2FFFF
| 252741 ||  || — || February 12, 2002 || Kitt Peak || Spacewatch || L4 || align=right | 9.6 km || 
|-id=742 bgcolor=#C2FFFF
| 252742 ||  || — || February 24, 2002 || Palomar || NEAT || L4 || align=right | 10 km || 
|-id=743 bgcolor=#C2FFFF
| 252743 ||  || — || March 6, 2002 || Ondřejov || P. Kušnirák || L4 || align=right | 12 km || 
|-id=744 bgcolor=#fefefe
| 252744 ||  || — || March 7, 2002 || Cima Ekar || ADAS || FLO || align=right data-sort-value="0.82" | 820 m || 
|-id=745 bgcolor=#d6d6d6
| 252745 ||  || — || March 10, 2002 || Cima Ekar || ADAS || 637 || align=right | 3.1 km || 
|-id=746 bgcolor=#C2FFFF
| 252746 ||  || — || March 11, 2002 || Palomar || NEAT || L4 || align=right | 14 km || 
|-id=747 bgcolor=#d6d6d6
| 252747 ||  || — || March 4, 2002 || Palomar || NEAT || — || align=right | 3.6 km || 
|-id=748 bgcolor=#d6d6d6
| 252748 ||  || — || March 5, 2002 || Kitt Peak || Spacewatch || KOR || align=right | 1.8 km || 
|-id=749 bgcolor=#d6d6d6
| 252749 ||  || — || March 9, 2002 || Socorro || LINEAR || EOS || align=right | 3.5 km || 
|-id=750 bgcolor=#fefefe
| 252750 ||  || — || March 9, 2002 || Socorro || LINEAR || — || align=right | 1.0 km || 
|-id=751 bgcolor=#fefefe
| 252751 ||  || — || March 9, 2002 || Socorro || LINEAR || FLO || align=right data-sort-value="0.71" | 710 m || 
|-id=752 bgcolor=#d6d6d6
| 252752 ||  || — || March 9, 2002 || Palomar || NEAT || — || align=right | 3.2 km || 
|-id=753 bgcolor=#d6d6d6
| 252753 ||  || — || March 11, 2002 || Palomar || NEAT || — || align=right | 5.0 km || 
|-id=754 bgcolor=#d6d6d6
| 252754 ||  || — || March 12, 2002 || Socorro || LINEAR || — || align=right | 6.1 km || 
|-id=755 bgcolor=#fefefe
| 252755 ||  || — || March 12, 2002 || Socorro || LINEAR || — || align=right | 1.1 km || 
|-id=756 bgcolor=#fefefe
| 252756 ||  || — || March 10, 2002 || Haleakala || NEAT || FLO || align=right data-sort-value="0.85" | 850 m || 
|-id=757 bgcolor=#d6d6d6
| 252757 ||  || — || March 12, 2002 || Palomar || NEAT || — || align=right | 3.1 km || 
|-id=758 bgcolor=#fefefe
| 252758 ||  || — || March 12, 2002 || Palomar || NEAT || — || align=right | 1.1 km || 
|-id=759 bgcolor=#d6d6d6
| 252759 ||  || — || March 12, 2002 || Palomar || NEAT || — || align=right | 4.1 km || 
|-id=760 bgcolor=#fefefe
| 252760 ||  || — || March 13, 2002 || Kitt Peak || Spacewatch || FLO || align=right data-sort-value="0.80" | 800 m || 
|-id=761 bgcolor=#fefefe
| 252761 ||  || — || March 13, 2002 || Socorro || LINEAR || — || align=right | 1.2 km || 
|-id=762 bgcolor=#C2FFFF
| 252762 ||  || — || March 13, 2002 || Socorro || LINEAR || L4 || align=right | 16 km || 
|-id=763 bgcolor=#d6d6d6
| 252763 ||  || — || March 13, 2002 || Socorro || LINEAR || — || align=right | 4.9 km || 
|-id=764 bgcolor=#d6d6d6
| 252764 ||  || — || March 13, 2002 || Socorro || LINEAR || — || align=right | 5.2 km || 
|-id=765 bgcolor=#d6d6d6
| 252765 ||  || — || March 13, 2002 || Socorro || LINEAR || — || align=right | 6.3 km || 
|-id=766 bgcolor=#fefefe
| 252766 ||  || — || March 10, 2002 || Haleakala || NEAT || V || align=right | 1.1 km || 
|-id=767 bgcolor=#fefefe
| 252767 ||  || — || March 13, 2002 || Palomar || NEAT || FLO || align=right data-sort-value="0.76" | 760 m || 
|-id=768 bgcolor=#fefefe
| 252768 ||  || — || March 9, 2002 || Socorro || LINEAR || — || align=right data-sort-value="0.98" | 980 m || 
|-id=769 bgcolor=#fefefe
| 252769 ||  || — || March 12, 2002 || Socorro || LINEAR || — || align=right | 1.4 km || 
|-id=770 bgcolor=#d6d6d6
| 252770 ||  || — || March 12, 2002 || Socorro || LINEAR || — || align=right | 3.7 km || 
|-id=771 bgcolor=#fefefe
| 252771 ||  || — || March 14, 2002 || Socorro || LINEAR || — || align=right | 1.2 km || 
|-id=772 bgcolor=#fefefe
| 252772 ||  || — || March 9, 2002 || Palomar || NEAT || — || align=right | 1.3 km || 
|-id=773 bgcolor=#d6d6d6
| 252773 ||  || — || March 9, 2002 || Anderson Mesa || LONEOS || — || align=right | 5.7 km || 
|-id=774 bgcolor=#fefefe
| 252774 ||  || — || March 9, 2002 || Palomar || NEAT || FLO || align=right data-sort-value="0.91" | 910 m || 
|-id=775 bgcolor=#d6d6d6
| 252775 ||  || — || March 11, 2002 || Kitt Peak || Spacewatch || — || align=right | 4.5 km || 
|-id=776 bgcolor=#d6d6d6
| 252776 ||  || — || March 12, 2002 || Palomar || NEAT || — || align=right | 3.3 km || 
|-id=777 bgcolor=#d6d6d6
| 252777 ||  || — || March 12, 2002 || Kitt Peak || Spacewatch || HYG || align=right | 3.8 km || 
|-id=778 bgcolor=#fefefe
| 252778 ||  || — || March 12, 2002 || Anderson Mesa || LONEOS || — || align=right | 1.2 km || 
|-id=779 bgcolor=#fefefe
| 252779 ||  || — || March 12, 2002 || Palomar || NEAT || — || align=right | 1.2 km || 
|-id=780 bgcolor=#d6d6d6
| 252780 ||  || — || March 13, 2002 || Socorro || LINEAR || — || align=right | 4.8 km || 
|-id=781 bgcolor=#fefefe
| 252781 ||  || — || March 11, 2002 || Cima Ekar || ADAS || — || align=right | 1.7 km || 
|-id=782 bgcolor=#E9E9E9
| 252782 ||  || — || March 12, 2002 || Socorro || LINEAR || — || align=right | 3.9 km || 
|-id=783 bgcolor=#d6d6d6
| 252783 ||  || — || March 13, 2002 || Palomar || NEAT || EOS || align=right | 2.5 km || 
|-id=784 bgcolor=#d6d6d6
| 252784 ||  || — || March 13, 2002 || Socorro || LINEAR || — || align=right | 4.1 km || 
|-id=785 bgcolor=#d6d6d6
| 252785 ||  || — || March 13, 2002 || Palomar || NEAT || — || align=right | 3.7 km || 
|-id=786 bgcolor=#d6d6d6
| 252786 ||  || — || March 12, 2002 || Palomar || NEAT || KOR || align=right | 2.0 km || 
|-id=787 bgcolor=#fefefe
| 252787 ||  || — || March 12, 2002 || Palomar || NEAT || EUT || align=right data-sort-value="0.92" | 920 m || 
|-id=788 bgcolor=#d6d6d6
| 252788 ||  || — || March 12, 2002 || Palomar || NEAT || — || align=right | 2.3 km || 
|-id=789 bgcolor=#d6d6d6
| 252789 ||  || — || March 14, 2002 || Palomar || NEAT || THB || align=right | 4.4 km || 
|-id=790 bgcolor=#d6d6d6
| 252790 ||  || — || March 13, 2002 || Socorro || LINEAR || CHA || align=right | 3.5 km || 
|-id=791 bgcolor=#d6d6d6
| 252791 ||  || — || March 10, 2002 || Kitt Peak || Spacewatch || TEL || align=right | 1.5 km || 
|-id=792 bgcolor=#d6d6d6
| 252792 ||  || — || March 10, 2002 || Palomar || NEAT || — || align=right | 6.2 km || 
|-id=793 bgcolor=#FFC2E0
| 252793 ||  || — || March 20, 2002 || Socorro || LINEAR || AMO || align=right data-sort-value="0.49" | 490 m || 
|-id=794 bgcolor=#d6d6d6
| 252794 Maironis ||  ||  || March 16, 2002 || Moletai || K. Černis, J. Zdanavičius || TIR || align=right | 4.4 km || 
|-id=795 bgcolor=#d6d6d6
| 252795 ||  || — || March 16, 2002 || Socorro || LINEAR || EOS || align=right | 3.5 km || 
|-id=796 bgcolor=#fefefe
| 252796 ||  || — || March 16, 2002 || Socorro || LINEAR || FLO || align=right | 1.1 km || 
|-id=797 bgcolor=#d6d6d6
| 252797 ||  || — || March 16, 2002 || Haleakala || NEAT || — || align=right | 4.2 km || 
|-id=798 bgcolor=#fefefe
| 252798 ||  || — || March 16, 2002 || Haleakala || NEAT || PHO || align=right | 1.5 km || 
|-id=799 bgcolor=#d6d6d6
| 252799 ||  || — || March 18, 2002 || Kitt Peak || Spacewatch || EOS || align=right | 2.6 km || 
|-id=800 bgcolor=#fefefe
| 252800 ||  || — || March 19, 2002 || Anderson Mesa || LONEOS || — || align=right | 1.4 km || 
|}

252801–252900 

|-bgcolor=#d6d6d6
| 252801 ||  || — || March 19, 2002 || Palomar || NEAT || — || align=right | 4.9 km || 
|-id=802 bgcolor=#fefefe
| 252802 ||  || — || March 19, 2002 || Anderson Mesa || LONEOS || FLO || align=right data-sort-value="0.76" | 760 m || 
|-id=803 bgcolor=#d6d6d6
| 252803 ||  || — || March 17, 2002 || Kitt Peak || Spacewatch || VER || align=right | 4.0 km || 
|-id=804 bgcolor=#fefefe
| 252804 ||  || — || March 17, 2002 || Kitt Peak || Spacewatch || NYS || align=right data-sort-value="0.81" | 810 m || 
|-id=805 bgcolor=#fefefe
| 252805 ||  || — || April 3, 2002 || Drebach || G. Lehmann || FLO || align=right data-sort-value="0.81" | 810 m || 
|-id=806 bgcolor=#fefefe
| 252806 ||  || — || April 9, 2002 || Socorro || LINEAR || H || align=right data-sort-value="0.77" | 770 m || 
|-id=807 bgcolor=#d6d6d6
| 252807 ||  || — || April 12, 2002 || Palomar || NEAT || — || align=right | 5.5 km || 
|-id=808 bgcolor=#fefefe
| 252808 ||  || — || April 14, 2002 || Socorro || LINEAR || — || align=right data-sort-value="0.97" | 970 m || 
|-id=809 bgcolor=#d6d6d6
| 252809 ||  || — || April 15, 2002 || Socorro || LINEAR || — || align=right | 4.6 km || 
|-id=810 bgcolor=#d6d6d6
| 252810 ||  || — || April 15, 2002 || Socorro || LINEAR || — || align=right | 5.1 km || 
|-id=811 bgcolor=#fefefe
| 252811 ||  || — || April 14, 2002 || Socorro || LINEAR || — || align=right | 1.2 km || 
|-id=812 bgcolor=#d6d6d6
| 252812 ||  || — || April 1, 2002 || Palomar || NEAT || — || align=right | 4.6 km || 
|-id=813 bgcolor=#d6d6d6
| 252813 ||  || — || April 4, 2002 || Palomar || NEAT || — || align=right | 4.7 km || 
|-id=814 bgcolor=#d6d6d6
| 252814 ||  || — || April 4, 2002 || Haleakala || NEAT || CRO || align=right | 4.8 km || 
|-id=815 bgcolor=#fefefe
| 252815 ||  || — || April 4, 2002 || Haleakala || NEAT || FLO || align=right | 1.2 km || 
|-id=816 bgcolor=#d6d6d6
| 252816 ||  || — || April 2, 2002 || Palomar || NEAT || — || align=right | 6.7 km || 
|-id=817 bgcolor=#fefefe
| 252817 ||  || — || April 5, 2002 || Anderson Mesa || LONEOS || — || align=right data-sort-value="0.79" | 790 m || 
|-id=818 bgcolor=#d6d6d6
| 252818 ||  || — || April 4, 2002 || Kitt Peak || Spacewatch || — || align=right | 3.2 km || 
|-id=819 bgcolor=#fefefe
| 252819 ||  || — || April 5, 2002 || Bergisch Gladbac || W. Bickel || — || align=right | 1.1 km || 
|-id=820 bgcolor=#fefefe
| 252820 ||  || — || April 8, 2002 || Palomar || NEAT || NYS || align=right data-sort-value="0.79" | 790 m || 
|-id=821 bgcolor=#d6d6d6
| 252821 ||  || — || April 8, 2002 || Palomar || NEAT || — || align=right | 3.3 km || 
|-id=822 bgcolor=#fefefe
| 252822 ||  || — || April 8, 2002 || Palomar || NEAT || NYS || align=right | 2.5 km || 
|-id=823 bgcolor=#d6d6d6
| 252823 ||  || — || April 8, 2002 || Palomar || NEAT || — || align=right | 4.7 km || 
|-id=824 bgcolor=#fefefe
| 252824 ||  || — || April 9, 2002 || Anderson Mesa || LONEOS || FLO || align=right data-sort-value="0.91" | 910 m || 
|-id=825 bgcolor=#d6d6d6
| 252825 ||  || — || April 9, 2002 || Socorro || LINEAR || EOS || align=right | 4.0 km || 
|-id=826 bgcolor=#d6d6d6
| 252826 ||  || — || April 9, 2002 || Socorro || LINEAR || HYG || align=right | 4.3 km || 
|-id=827 bgcolor=#d6d6d6
| 252827 ||  || — || April 9, 2002 || Socorro || LINEAR || — || align=right | 5.5 km || 
|-id=828 bgcolor=#d6d6d6
| 252828 ||  || — || April 10, 2002 || Socorro || LINEAR || URS || align=right | 4.5 km || 
|-id=829 bgcolor=#d6d6d6
| 252829 ||  || — || April 10, 2002 || Socorro || LINEAR || VER || align=right | 6.3 km || 
|-id=830 bgcolor=#fefefe
| 252830 ||  || — || April 11, 2002 || Socorro || LINEAR || — || align=right | 1.2 km || 
|-id=831 bgcolor=#d6d6d6
| 252831 ||  || — || April 10, 2002 || Socorro || LINEAR || — || align=right | 4.6 km || 
|-id=832 bgcolor=#fefefe
| 252832 ||  || — || April 10, 2002 || Socorro || LINEAR || V || align=right | 1.1 km || 
|-id=833 bgcolor=#d6d6d6
| 252833 ||  || — || April 11, 2002 || Socorro || LINEAR || — || align=right | 6.8 km || 
|-id=834 bgcolor=#d6d6d6
| 252834 ||  || — || April 11, 2002 || Socorro || LINEAR || VER || align=right | 4.8 km || 
|-id=835 bgcolor=#d6d6d6
| 252835 ||  || — || April 11, 2002 || Socorro || LINEAR || — || align=right | 5.2 km || 
|-id=836 bgcolor=#fefefe
| 252836 ||  || — || April 11, 2002 || Haleakala || NEAT || — || align=right | 1.1 km || 
|-id=837 bgcolor=#fefefe
| 252837 ||  || — || April 12, 2002 || Socorro || LINEAR || — || align=right | 1.3 km || 
|-id=838 bgcolor=#d6d6d6
| 252838 ||  || — || April 10, 2002 || Socorro || LINEAR || — || align=right | 6.0 km || 
|-id=839 bgcolor=#d6d6d6
| 252839 ||  || — || April 10, 2002 || Socorro || LINEAR || HYG || align=right | 3.9 km || 
|-id=840 bgcolor=#fefefe
| 252840 ||  || — || April 10, 2002 || Socorro || LINEAR || NYS || align=right | 1.1 km || 
|-id=841 bgcolor=#fefefe
| 252841 ||  || — || April 10, 2002 || Socorro || LINEAR || FLO || align=right data-sort-value="0.95" | 950 m || 
|-id=842 bgcolor=#fefefe
| 252842 ||  || — || April 10, 2002 || Socorro || LINEAR || FLO || align=right data-sort-value="0.84" | 840 m || 
|-id=843 bgcolor=#d6d6d6
| 252843 ||  || — || April 12, 2002 || Socorro || LINEAR || — || align=right | 3.5 km || 
|-id=844 bgcolor=#d6d6d6
| 252844 ||  || — || April 12, 2002 || Socorro || LINEAR || HYG || align=right | 3.9 km || 
|-id=845 bgcolor=#d6d6d6
| 252845 ||  || — || April 12, 2002 || Socorro || LINEAR || EOS || align=right | 3.0 km || 
|-id=846 bgcolor=#d6d6d6
| 252846 ||  || — || April 12, 2002 || Socorro || LINEAR || — || align=right | 5.3 km || 
|-id=847 bgcolor=#d6d6d6
| 252847 ||  || — || April 12, 2002 || Socorro || LINEAR || — || align=right | 4.5 km || 
|-id=848 bgcolor=#fefefe
| 252848 ||  || — || April 12, 2002 || Kitt Peak || Spacewatch || — || align=right data-sort-value="0.89" | 890 m || 
|-id=849 bgcolor=#C2FFFF
| 252849 ||  || — || April 13, 2002 || Palomar || NEAT || L4 || align=right | 17 km || 
|-id=850 bgcolor=#d6d6d6
| 252850 ||  || — || April 13, 2002 || Palomar || NEAT || — || align=right | 4.3 km || 
|-id=851 bgcolor=#fefefe
| 252851 ||  || — || April 13, 2002 || Palomar || NEAT || FLO || align=right data-sort-value="0.88" | 880 m || 
|-id=852 bgcolor=#d6d6d6
| 252852 ||  || — || April 13, 2002 || Palomar || NEAT || — || align=right | 4.7 km || 
|-id=853 bgcolor=#fefefe
| 252853 ||  || — || April 14, 2002 || Socorro || LINEAR || V || align=right data-sort-value="0.84" | 840 m || 
|-id=854 bgcolor=#fefefe
| 252854 ||  || — || April 14, 2002 || Socorro || LINEAR || — || align=right data-sort-value="0.77" | 770 m || 
|-id=855 bgcolor=#fefefe
| 252855 ||  || — || April 14, 2002 || Haleakala || NEAT || — || align=right | 1.2 km || 
|-id=856 bgcolor=#fefefe
| 252856 ||  || — || April 13, 2002 || Palomar || NEAT || V || align=right data-sort-value="0.92" | 920 m || 
|-id=857 bgcolor=#d6d6d6
| 252857 ||  || — || April 9, 2002 || Socorro || LINEAR || — || align=right | 4.3 km || 
|-id=858 bgcolor=#d6d6d6
| 252858 ||  || — || April 8, 2002 || Palomar || NEAT || — || align=right | 4.5 km || 
|-id=859 bgcolor=#fefefe
| 252859 ||  || — || April 10, 2002 || Palomar || NEAT || — || align=right | 1.0 km || 
|-id=860 bgcolor=#fefefe
| 252860 ||  || — || April 8, 2002 || Palomar || NEAT || NYS || align=right data-sort-value="0.64" | 640 m || 
|-id=861 bgcolor=#d6d6d6
| 252861 ||  || — || April 4, 2002 || Palomar || NEAT || — || align=right | 4.5 km || 
|-id=862 bgcolor=#d6d6d6
| 252862 ||  || — || April 8, 2002 || Palomar || NEAT || — || align=right | 4.0 km || 
|-id=863 bgcolor=#fefefe
| 252863 ||  || — || April 16, 2002 || Socorro || LINEAR || — || align=right data-sort-value="0.93" | 930 m || 
|-id=864 bgcolor=#d6d6d6
| 252864 ||  || — || April 22, 2002 || Palomar || NEAT || EUP || align=right | 5.0 km || 
|-id=865 bgcolor=#d6d6d6
| 252865 ||  || — || April 17, 2002 || Socorro || LINEAR || — || align=right | 3.9 km || 
|-id=866 bgcolor=#d6d6d6
| 252866 ||  || — || April 20, 2002 || Kitt Peak || Spacewatch || HYG || align=right | 3.9 km || 
|-id=867 bgcolor=#fefefe
| 252867 ||  || — || May 5, 2002 || Desert Eagle || W. K. Y. Yeung || FLO || align=right | 1.0 km || 
|-id=868 bgcolor=#d6d6d6
| 252868 ||  || — || May 5, 2002 || Palomar || NEAT || — || align=right | 5.2 km || 
|-id=869 bgcolor=#d6d6d6
| 252869 ||  || — || May 8, 2002 || Haleakala || NEAT || AEG || align=right | 3.9 km || 
|-id=870 bgcolor=#fefefe
| 252870 ||  || — || May 8, 2002 || Socorro || LINEAR || — || align=right | 1.2 km || 
|-id=871 bgcolor=#fefefe
| 252871 ||  || — || May 8, 2002 || Socorro || LINEAR || FLO || align=right data-sort-value="0.96" | 960 m || 
|-id=872 bgcolor=#fefefe
| 252872 ||  || — || May 8, 2002 || Socorro || LINEAR || FLO || align=right | 1.3 km || 
|-id=873 bgcolor=#fefefe
| 252873 ||  || — || May 9, 2002 || Socorro || LINEAR || NYS || align=right data-sort-value="0.89" | 890 m || 
|-id=874 bgcolor=#d6d6d6
| 252874 ||  || — || May 7, 2002 || Palomar || NEAT || — || align=right | 5.3 km || 
|-id=875 bgcolor=#fefefe
| 252875 ||  || — || May 8, 2002 || Socorro || LINEAR || V || align=right data-sort-value="0.92" | 920 m || 
|-id=876 bgcolor=#d6d6d6
| 252876 ||  || — || May 9, 2002 || Socorro || LINEAR || — || align=right | 5.5 km || 
|-id=877 bgcolor=#d6d6d6
| 252877 ||  || — || May 9, 2002 || Socorro || LINEAR || — || align=right | 4.8 km || 
|-id=878 bgcolor=#fefefe
| 252878 ||  || — || May 9, 2002 || Socorro || LINEAR || — || align=right | 1.3 km || 
|-id=879 bgcolor=#fefefe
| 252879 ||  || — || May 10, 2002 || Socorro || LINEAR || — || align=right data-sort-value="0.89" | 890 m || 
|-id=880 bgcolor=#fefefe
| 252880 ||  || — || May 8, 2002 || Socorro || LINEAR || FLO || align=right | 1.1 km || 
|-id=881 bgcolor=#FA8072
| 252881 ||  || — || May 9, 2002 || Socorro || LINEAR || — || align=right | 1.0 km || 
|-id=882 bgcolor=#FA8072
| 252882 ||  || — || May 11, 2002 || Socorro || LINEAR || — || align=right | 1.3 km || 
|-id=883 bgcolor=#fefefe
| 252883 ||  || — || May 11, 2002 || Socorro || LINEAR || — || align=right | 1.0 km || 
|-id=884 bgcolor=#fefefe
| 252884 ||  || — || May 11, 2002 || Socorro || LINEAR || — || align=right | 1.0 km || 
|-id=885 bgcolor=#fefefe
| 252885 ||  || — || May 11, 2002 || Socorro || LINEAR || V || align=right data-sort-value="0.86" | 860 m || 
|-id=886 bgcolor=#d6d6d6
| 252886 ||  || — || May 11, 2002 || Socorro || LINEAR || — || align=right | 3.4 km || 
|-id=887 bgcolor=#fefefe
| 252887 ||  || — || May 11, 2002 || Socorro || LINEAR || NYS || align=right data-sort-value="0.86" | 860 m || 
|-id=888 bgcolor=#d6d6d6
| 252888 ||  || — || May 11, 2002 || Socorro || LINEAR || — || align=right | 3.4 km || 
|-id=889 bgcolor=#d6d6d6
| 252889 ||  || — || May 11, 2002 || Socorro || LINEAR || 7:4 || align=right | 3.7 km || 
|-id=890 bgcolor=#fefefe
| 252890 ||  || — || May 11, 2002 || Socorro || LINEAR || — || align=right | 1.0 km || 
|-id=891 bgcolor=#fefefe
| 252891 ||  || — || May 11, 2002 || Socorro || LINEAR || V || align=right data-sort-value="0.78" | 780 m || 
|-id=892 bgcolor=#d6d6d6
| 252892 ||  || — || May 11, 2002 || Socorro || LINEAR || — || align=right | 4.5 km || 
|-id=893 bgcolor=#d6d6d6
| 252893 ||  || — || May 11, 2002 || Socorro || LINEAR || ALA || align=right | 5.4 km || 
|-id=894 bgcolor=#d6d6d6
| 252894 ||  || — || May 11, 2002 || Socorro || LINEAR || — || align=right | 4.3 km || 
|-id=895 bgcolor=#d6d6d6
| 252895 ||  || — || May 9, 2002 || Socorro || LINEAR || EUP || align=right | 6.7 km || 
|-id=896 bgcolor=#fefefe
| 252896 ||  || — || May 10, 2002 || Socorro || LINEAR || — || align=right data-sort-value="0.95" | 950 m || 
|-id=897 bgcolor=#fefefe
| 252897 ||  || — || May 12, 2002 || Socorro || LINEAR || — || align=right | 1.2 km || 
|-id=898 bgcolor=#fefefe
| 252898 ||  || — || May 13, 2002 || Socorro || LINEAR || — || align=right | 2.6 km || 
|-id=899 bgcolor=#d6d6d6
| 252899 ||  || — || May 4, 2002 || Palomar || NEAT || EUP || align=right | 5.4 km || 
|-id=900 bgcolor=#d6d6d6
| 252900 ||  || — || May 5, 2002 || Palomar || NEAT || — || align=right | 6.1 km || 
|}

252901–253000 

|-bgcolor=#fefefe
| 252901 ||  || — || May 6, 2002 || Palomar || NEAT || FLO || align=right data-sort-value="0.76" | 760 m || 
|-id=902 bgcolor=#FA8072
| 252902 ||  || — || May 7, 2002 || Palomar || NEAT || — || align=right | 1.2 km || 
|-id=903 bgcolor=#d6d6d6
| 252903 ||  || — || May 8, 2002 || Anderson Mesa || LONEOS || — || align=right | 4.8 km || 
|-id=904 bgcolor=#d6d6d6
| 252904 ||  || — || May 9, 2002 || Palomar || NEAT || — || align=right | 4.9 km || 
|-id=905 bgcolor=#fefefe
| 252905 ||  || — || May 9, 2002 || Palomar || NEAT || — || align=right | 1.0 km || 
|-id=906 bgcolor=#d6d6d6
| 252906 ||  || — || May 9, 2002 || Palomar || NEAT || URS || align=right | 4.2 km || 
|-id=907 bgcolor=#d6d6d6
| 252907 ||  || — || May 9, 2002 || Palomar || NEAT || THM || align=right | 3.1 km || 
|-id=908 bgcolor=#fefefe
| 252908 ||  || — || May 11, 2002 || Socorro || LINEAR || — || align=right data-sort-value="0.73" | 730 m || 
|-id=909 bgcolor=#fefefe
| 252909 ||  || — || May 18, 2002 || Socorro || LINEAR || H || align=right | 1.1 km || 
|-id=910 bgcolor=#fefefe
| 252910 ||  || — || June 5, 2002 || Socorro || LINEAR || FLO || align=right data-sort-value="0.98" | 980 m || 
|-id=911 bgcolor=#fefefe
| 252911 ||  || — || June 6, 2002 || Socorro || LINEAR || CHL || align=right | 2.6 km || 
|-id=912 bgcolor=#fefefe
| 252912 ||  || — || June 6, 2002 || Socorro || LINEAR || FLO || align=right data-sort-value="0.91" | 910 m || 
|-id=913 bgcolor=#fefefe
| 252913 ||  || — || June 6, 2002 || Socorro || LINEAR || — || align=right | 1.1 km || 
|-id=914 bgcolor=#fefefe
| 252914 ||  || — || June 6, 2002 || Socorro || LINEAR || — || align=right | 2.0 km || 
|-id=915 bgcolor=#fefefe
| 252915 ||  || — || June 8, 2002 || Kitt Peak || Spacewatch || V || align=right data-sort-value="0.82" | 820 m || 
|-id=916 bgcolor=#d6d6d6
| 252916 ||  || — || June 11, 2002 || Palomar || NEAT || — || align=right | 5.7 km || 
|-id=917 bgcolor=#fefefe
| 252917 ||  || — || June 13, 2002 || Palomar || NEAT || — || align=right | 1.0 km || 
|-id=918 bgcolor=#fefefe
| 252918 ||  || — || July 9, 2002 || Socorro || LINEAR || V || align=right | 1.0 km || 
|-id=919 bgcolor=#fefefe
| 252919 ||  || — || July 9, 2002 || Socorro || LINEAR || V || align=right | 1.2 km || 
|-id=920 bgcolor=#fefefe
| 252920 ||  || — || July 13, 2002 || Haleakala || NEAT || — || align=right | 1.1 km || 
|-id=921 bgcolor=#fefefe
| 252921 ||  || — || July 13, 2002 || Haleakala || NEAT || — || align=right | 1.1 km || 
|-id=922 bgcolor=#fefefe
| 252922 ||  || — || July 9, 2002 || Socorro || LINEAR || H || align=right data-sort-value="0.76" | 760 m || 
|-id=923 bgcolor=#fefefe
| 252923 ||  || — || July 14, 2002 || Palomar || NEAT || NYS || align=right data-sort-value="0.87" | 870 m || 
|-id=924 bgcolor=#fefefe
| 252924 ||  || — || July 12, 2002 || Palomar || NEAT || — || align=right | 1.3 km || 
|-id=925 bgcolor=#E9E9E9
| 252925 ||  || — || July 14, 2002 || Palomar || NEAT || — || align=right | 1.4 km || 
|-id=926 bgcolor=#fefefe
| 252926 ||  || — || July 9, 2002 || Palomar || NEAT || NYS || align=right data-sort-value="0.76" | 760 m || 
|-id=927 bgcolor=#fefefe
| 252927 ||  || — || July 5, 2002 || Palomar || NEAT || V || align=right data-sort-value="0.80" | 800 m || 
|-id=928 bgcolor=#fefefe
| 252928 ||  || — || July 14, 2002 || Palomar || NEAT || — || align=right data-sort-value="0.99" | 990 m || 
|-id=929 bgcolor=#fefefe
| 252929 ||  || — || July 4, 2002 || Palomar || NEAT || — || align=right | 1.6 km || 
|-id=930 bgcolor=#fefefe
| 252930 ||  || — || July 4, 2002 || Palomar || NEAT || MAS || align=right data-sort-value="0.93" | 930 m || 
|-id=931 bgcolor=#fefefe
| 252931 ||  || — || July 22, 2002 || Palomar || NEAT || — || align=right data-sort-value="0.94" | 940 m || 
|-id=932 bgcolor=#fefefe
| 252932 ||  || — || July 22, 2002 || Palomar || NEAT || NYS || align=right data-sort-value="0.92" | 920 m || 
|-id=933 bgcolor=#fefefe
| 252933 ||  || — || August 2, 2002 || Campo Imperatore || CINEOS || V || align=right | 1.1 km || 
|-id=934 bgcolor=#fefefe
| 252934 ||  || — || August 6, 2002 || Palomar || NEAT || NYS || align=right data-sort-value="0.91" | 910 m || 
|-id=935 bgcolor=#fefefe
| 252935 ||  || — || August 5, 2002 || Palomar || NEAT || — || align=right | 1.2 km || 
|-id=936 bgcolor=#fefefe
| 252936 ||  || — || August 6, 2002 || Palomar || NEAT || — || align=right | 1.1 km || 
|-id=937 bgcolor=#fefefe
| 252937 ||  || — || August 6, 2002 || Palomar || NEAT || — || align=right data-sort-value="0.95" | 950 m || 
|-id=938 bgcolor=#fefefe
| 252938 ||  || — || August 6, 2002 || Palomar || NEAT || V || align=right data-sort-value="0.86" | 860 m || 
|-id=939 bgcolor=#fefefe
| 252939 ||  || — || August 6, 2002 || Palomar || NEAT || — || align=right | 1.2 km || 
|-id=940 bgcolor=#E9E9E9
| 252940 ||  || — || August 6, 2002 || Palomar || NEAT || — || align=right | 1.4 km || 
|-id=941 bgcolor=#fefefe
| 252941 ||  || — || August 6, 2002 || Palomar || NEAT || — || align=right data-sort-value="0.93" | 930 m || 
|-id=942 bgcolor=#fefefe
| 252942 ||  || — || August 6, 2002 || Palomar || NEAT || V || align=right data-sort-value="0.98" | 980 m || 
|-id=943 bgcolor=#fefefe
| 252943 ||  || — || August 6, 2002 || Palomar || NEAT || MAS || align=right data-sort-value="0.92" | 920 m || 
|-id=944 bgcolor=#fefefe
| 252944 ||  || — || August 11, 2002 || Needville || Needville Obs. || — || align=right | 1.2 km || 
|-id=945 bgcolor=#fefefe
| 252945 ||  || — || August 8, 2002 || Palomar || NEAT || MAS || align=right data-sort-value="0.85" | 850 m || 
|-id=946 bgcolor=#E9E9E9
| 252946 ||  || — || August 10, 2002 || Socorro || LINEAR || — || align=right | 1.4 km || 
|-id=947 bgcolor=#fefefe
| 252947 ||  || — || August 6, 2002 || Palomar || NEAT || — || align=right | 1.3 km || 
|-id=948 bgcolor=#E9E9E9
| 252948 ||  || — || August 12, 2002 || Socorro || LINEAR || — || align=right | 2.8 km || 
|-id=949 bgcolor=#fefefe
| 252949 ||  || — || August 8, 2002 || Palomar || NEAT || V || align=right | 1.0 km || 
|-id=950 bgcolor=#E9E9E9
| 252950 ||  || — || August 11, 2002 || Haleakala || NEAT || — || align=right | 1.7 km || 
|-id=951 bgcolor=#E9E9E9
| 252951 ||  || — || August 11, 2002 || Palomar || NEAT || NEM || align=right | 3.9 km || 
|-id=952 bgcolor=#fefefe
| 252952 ||  || — || August 11, 2002 || Socorro || LINEAR || — || align=right | 1.7 km || 
|-id=953 bgcolor=#fefefe
| 252953 ||  || — || August 13, 2002 || Socorro || LINEAR || ERI || align=right | 3.6 km || 
|-id=954 bgcolor=#fefefe
| 252954 ||  || — || August 14, 2002 || Socorro || LINEAR || — || align=right | 3.2 km || 
|-id=955 bgcolor=#E9E9E9
| 252955 ||  || — || August 13, 2002 || Palomar || NEAT || — || align=right | 1.4 km || 
|-id=956 bgcolor=#fefefe
| 252956 ||  || — || August 14, 2002 || Socorro || LINEAR || — || align=right | 1.3 km || 
|-id=957 bgcolor=#E9E9E9
| 252957 ||  || — || August 14, 2002 || Socorro || LINEAR || — || align=right | 2.4 km || 
|-id=958 bgcolor=#fefefe
| 252958 ||  || — || August 14, 2002 || Anderson Mesa || LONEOS || V || align=right | 1.2 km || 
|-id=959 bgcolor=#E9E9E9
| 252959 ||  || — || August 12, 2002 || Haleakala || NEAT || — || align=right | 1.4 km || 
|-id=960 bgcolor=#E9E9E9
| 252960 ||  || — || August 13, 2002 || Anderson Mesa || LONEOS || — || align=right data-sort-value="0.96" | 960 m || 
|-id=961 bgcolor=#fefefe
| 252961 ||  || — || August 13, 2002 || Anderson Mesa || LONEOS || ERI || align=right | 1.9 km || 
|-id=962 bgcolor=#fefefe
| 252962 ||  || — || August 14, 2002 || Socorro || LINEAR || NYS || align=right data-sort-value="0.81" | 810 m || 
|-id=963 bgcolor=#fefefe
| 252963 ||  || — || August 14, 2002 || Socorro || LINEAR || — || align=right | 1.5 km || 
|-id=964 bgcolor=#fefefe
| 252964 ||  || — || August 15, 2002 || Anderson Mesa || LONEOS || — || align=right | 1.0 km || 
|-id=965 bgcolor=#fefefe
| 252965 ||  || — || August 12, 2002 || Socorro || LINEAR || H || align=right data-sort-value="0.76" | 760 m || 
|-id=966 bgcolor=#fefefe
| 252966 ||  || — || August 12, 2002 || Socorro || LINEAR || H || align=right data-sort-value="0.79" | 790 m || 
|-id=967 bgcolor=#fefefe
| 252967 ||  || — || August 15, 2002 || Socorro || LINEAR || H || align=right data-sort-value="0.77" | 770 m || 
|-id=968 bgcolor=#fefefe
| 252968 ||  || — || August 8, 2002 || Palomar || S. F. Hönig || MAS || align=right data-sort-value="0.87" | 870 m || 
|-id=969 bgcolor=#fefefe
| 252969 ||  || — || August 8, 2002 || Palomar || S. F. Hönig || NYS || align=right data-sort-value="0.79" | 790 m || 
|-id=970 bgcolor=#fefefe
| 252970 ||  || — || August 8, 2002 || Palomar || S. F. Hönig || — || align=right data-sort-value="0.96" | 960 m || 
|-id=971 bgcolor=#fefefe
| 252971 ||  || — || August 8, 2002 || Palomar || S. F. Hönig || NYS || align=right data-sort-value="0.87" | 870 m || 
|-id=972 bgcolor=#fefefe
| 252972 ||  || — || August 8, 2002 || Palomar || A. Lowe || — || align=right | 1.0 km || 
|-id=973 bgcolor=#fefefe
| 252973 ||  || — || August 8, 2002 || Palomar || NEAT || NYS || align=right data-sort-value="0.89" | 890 m || 
|-id=974 bgcolor=#fefefe
| 252974 ||  || — || August 15, 2002 || Palomar || NEAT || V || align=right data-sort-value="0.85" | 850 m || 
|-id=975 bgcolor=#fefefe
| 252975 ||  || — || August 26, 2002 || Palomar || NEAT || MAS || align=right data-sort-value="0.86" | 860 m || 
|-id=976 bgcolor=#fefefe
| 252976 ||  || — || August 27, 2002 || Palomar || NEAT || MAS || align=right data-sort-value="0.88" | 880 m || 
|-id=977 bgcolor=#fefefe
| 252977 ||  || — || August 27, 2002 || Palomar || NEAT || — || align=right data-sort-value="0.80" | 800 m || 
|-id=978 bgcolor=#fefefe
| 252978 ||  || — || August 29, 2002 || Palomar || NEAT || H || align=right data-sort-value="0.73" | 730 m || 
|-id=979 bgcolor=#fefefe
| 252979 ||  || — || August 29, 2002 || Palomar || NEAT || NYS || align=right data-sort-value="0.78" | 780 m || 
|-id=980 bgcolor=#fefefe
| 252980 ||  || — || August 29, 2002 || Palomar || NEAT || — || align=right | 1.1 km || 
|-id=981 bgcolor=#fefefe
| 252981 ||  || — || August 29, 2002 || Palomar || NEAT || — || align=right data-sort-value="0.86" | 860 m || 
|-id=982 bgcolor=#fefefe
| 252982 ||  || — || August 27, 2002 || Palomar || NEAT || NYS || align=right data-sort-value="0.70" | 700 m || 
|-id=983 bgcolor=#fefefe
| 252983 ||  || — || August 27, 2002 || Palomar || NEAT || — || align=right data-sort-value="0.57" | 570 m || 
|-id=984 bgcolor=#fefefe
| 252984 ||  || — || August 29, 2002 || Palomar || NEAT || — || align=right | 1.1 km || 
|-id=985 bgcolor=#fefefe
| 252985 ||  || — || August 28, 2002 || Palomar || NEAT || MAS || align=right | 1.0 km || 
|-id=986 bgcolor=#fefefe
| 252986 ||  || — || August 27, 2002 || Palomar || NEAT || NYS || align=right data-sort-value="0.73" | 730 m || 
|-id=987 bgcolor=#fefefe
| 252987 ||  || — || August 19, 2002 || Palomar || NEAT || V || align=right data-sort-value="0.93" | 930 m || 
|-id=988 bgcolor=#fefefe
| 252988 ||  || — || August 18, 2002 || Palomar || NEAT || MAS || align=right data-sort-value="0.93" | 930 m || 
|-id=989 bgcolor=#fefefe
| 252989 ||  || — || August 19, 2002 || Palomar || NEAT || — || align=right data-sort-value="0.97" | 970 m || 
|-id=990 bgcolor=#fefefe
| 252990 ||  || — || August 18, 2002 || Palomar || NEAT || V || align=right data-sort-value="0.82" | 820 m || 
|-id=991 bgcolor=#fefefe
| 252991 ||  || — || August 19, 2002 || Palomar || NEAT || V || align=right data-sort-value="0.81" | 810 m || 
|-id=992 bgcolor=#fefefe
| 252992 ||  || — || August 20, 2002 || Palomar || NEAT || — || align=right | 1.1 km || 
|-id=993 bgcolor=#fefefe
| 252993 ||  || — || August 19, 2002 || Palomar || NEAT || — || align=right | 1.0 km || 
|-id=994 bgcolor=#fefefe
| 252994 ||  || — || August 27, 2002 || Palomar || NEAT || — || align=right data-sort-value="0.94" | 940 m || 
|-id=995 bgcolor=#fefefe
| 252995 ||  || — || August 27, 2002 || Palomar || NEAT || MAS || align=right data-sort-value="0.90" | 900 m || 
|-id=996 bgcolor=#fefefe
| 252996 ||  || — || August 27, 2002 || Palomar || NEAT || — || align=right | 1.0 km || 
|-id=997 bgcolor=#fefefe
| 252997 ||  || — || August 28, 2002 || Palomar || NEAT || V || align=right | 1.1 km || 
|-id=998 bgcolor=#fefefe
| 252998 ||  || — || August 30, 2002 || Palomar || NEAT || — || align=right | 1.1 km || 
|-id=999 bgcolor=#fefefe
| 252999 ||  || — || August 30, 2002 || Palomar || NEAT || NYS || align=right data-sort-value="0.77" | 770 m || 
|-id=000 bgcolor=#E9E9E9
| 253000 ||  || — || September 4, 2002 || Palomar || NEAT || EUN || align=right | 1.5 km || 
|}

References

External links 
 Discovery Circumstances: Numbered Minor Planets (250001)–(255000) (IAU Minor Planet Center)

0252